= California Newspapers Partnership =

American newspaper publisher

- Company type: Private
- Industry: Newspapers
- Founded: February 1999
- Headquarters: San Ramon, California, United States
- Area served: California
- Products: Daily and weekly newspapers
- Parent: MediaNews (73.72% owner); Stephens Media (26.28%)

California Newspapers Partnership is a publisher of more than two dozen daily newspapers and several weekly newspapers in the United States state of California. The partnership is managed as a subsidiary of MediaNews Group, its majority owner. The minority partner is Stephens Media, with roughly a one-quarter ownership stake.

== History ==
William Dean Singleton, founder of MediaNews, pushed for the partnership in 1999 as part of his "clustering" strategy of newspaper ownership — owning groups of newspapers in a geographic area for economies of scale. For example, he had acquired five dailies in Northern California in the mid-1990s and centralized their operations into one copy and layout desk, and one team for special sections such as sports and features.

In an effort to achieve efficiencies on a larger scale, Singleton offered to pool its Bay Area papers — the Alamedia Newspaper Group — and the Los Angeles Daily News in a partnership with the Ontario, California, assets of Donrey Media Group (now called Stephens). A year after forming the partnership, the duo were joined by Gannett, which contributed the San Bernardino Sun and the Marin Independent Journal.

MediaNews entered into similar partnerships in New Mexico-Texas and Pennsylvania with Gannett, and in Colorado with E.W. Scripps Company. In 2015, Gannett gave its stake in CNP to MediaNews successor Digital First Media in exchange for the New Mexico-Texas and Pennsylvania and cash.

As MediaNews remains the largest shareholder in the California Newspaper Partnership, the partnership effectively functions as a subsidiary of Denver-based MediaNews Group, and a parent to MediaNews' three newspaper clusters in California, the Bay Area News Group, Los Angeles Newspaper Group and its Northern California holdings. Those operational clusters include a combination of newspapers owned by the partnership and newspapers wholly owned by MediaNews.

== Holdings ==
=== Bay Area ===
CNP dailies in the Bay Area News Group:

- Alameda Times-Star of Alameda, California
- The Argus of Fremont, California
- Contra Costa Times of Walnut Creek, California
- The Daily News of Palo Alto, California
- East County Times
- Marin Independent Journal of San Rafael, California
- San Jose Mercury News of San Jose, California
- Santa Cruz Sentinel of Santa Cruz, California

=== Northern California ===
CNP dailies in Northern California:

- Daily Democrat of Woodland, California
- Daily News of Red Bluff, California
- Enterprise Record of Chico, California
- Lake County Record-Bee of Lakeport, California
- Oroville Mercury Register of Oroville, California
- Times-Standard of Eureka, California
- Ukiah Daily Journal of Ukiah, California
- Vacaville Reporter of Vacaville, California
- Vallejo Times Herald of Vallejo, California

=== Southern California ===
CNP dailies in the Southern California News Group:

- Inland Valley Daily Bulletin of Rancho Cucamonga, California
- Pasadena Star-News of Pasadena, California
- Redlands Daily Facts of Redlands, California
- San Gabriel Valley Tribune of Monrovia, California
- The Sun of San Bernardino, California
- Whittier Daily News of Whittier, California
- Orange County Register of Anaheim, California
- Riverside Press-Enterprise of Riverside, California
- Los Angeles Daily News of Woodland Hills, California
- Long Beach Press Telegram of Long Beach, California
- Torrance Daily Breeze of Torrance, California
