= Hawaii Tribune-Herald =

Newspaper published in Hawaii, United States

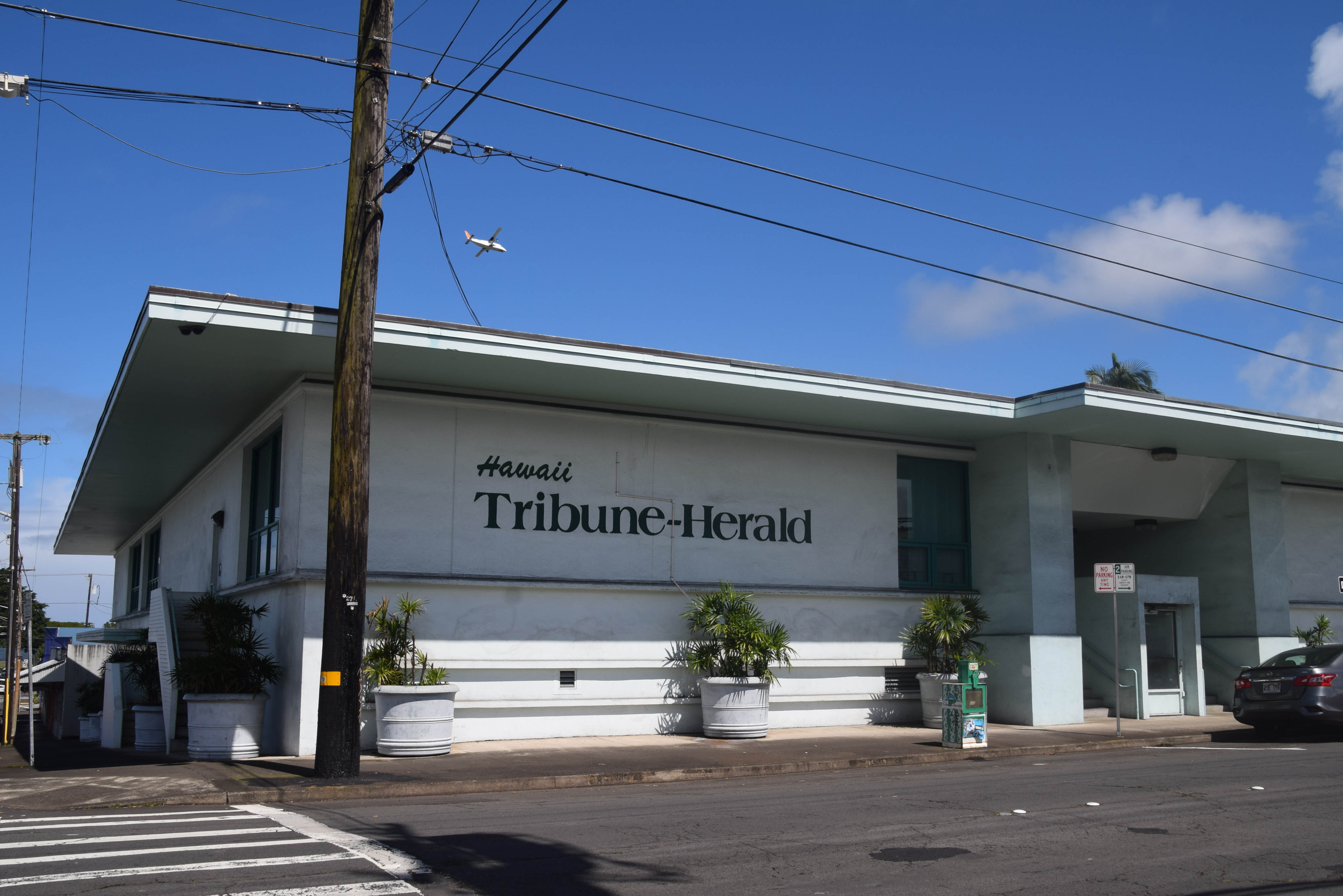
- The Hawaii Tribune-Herald's headquarters, in Hilo, Hawaii, U.S.
- Type: Daily newspaper
- Format: Broadsheet
- Owner: Oahu Publications
- Publisher: David Bock
- Editor: David Bock
- Founded: 1895
- Language: English
- Headquarters: 355 Kinoole Street, Hilo, HI 96720, U.S.
- Circulation: 9,224 Daily; 10,306 Sunday (as of 2022)
- Sister newspapers: West Hawaii Today
- Website: hawaiitribune-herald.com

Hawaii Tribune-Herald is a daily newspaper based in Hilo, Hawaii. It is owned and published by Oahu Publications, a subsidiary of Black Press.

== History ==
On November 23, 1895, the first edition of the Hilo Tribune was published. It was founded by a cooperation headed by Gardner K. Wilder. The Tribune was the oldest English paper in Hilo, Hawaii. A rival paper called The Hawaii Herald launched in August 1896, followed by The Hawaii Post in 1914. The Tribune was renamed to the Hilo Daily Tribune in 1917.

The Herald and Post merged in 1918 to form the Daily Post Herald. In 1923, the Tribune and Post-Herald merged to form the Hilo Tribune-Herald. Decades later it was renamed to the Hawaii Tribune-Herald.

In 1962, the newspaper began publication of a weekly special edition for the west (Kona) side of the island, called the Kona Tribune-Herald. This was expanded six years later into a daily called West Hawaii Today.

In 1964, Donrey Media Group acquired the paper. Owner Donald W. Reynolds died in 1993 and the company was renamed to Stephens Media in 2002. With the demise of the Hawaii Island Journal in June 2008, Tribune-Herald owner Stephens Media ran all the commercial newspapers on the island including the Big Island Weekly. Big Island Weekly published from 2006 to 2014.

In 2014, Oahu Publications, publisher of the Honolulu Star-Advertiser, bought the Hawaii Tribune-Herald and West Hawaii Today from Stephens Media. Oahu Publications was a subsidiary of Black Press Media, which was acquired by Carpenter Media Group in 2024.

== Subsidiary publications ==
- West Hawaii Today, Kailua-Kona, Hawaii (daily)

== See also ==
- Hawaii Herald, English-language edition of Hawaii Hochi since 1980
