= West Hawaii Today =

Kailua-Kona, Hawaii based daily newspaper

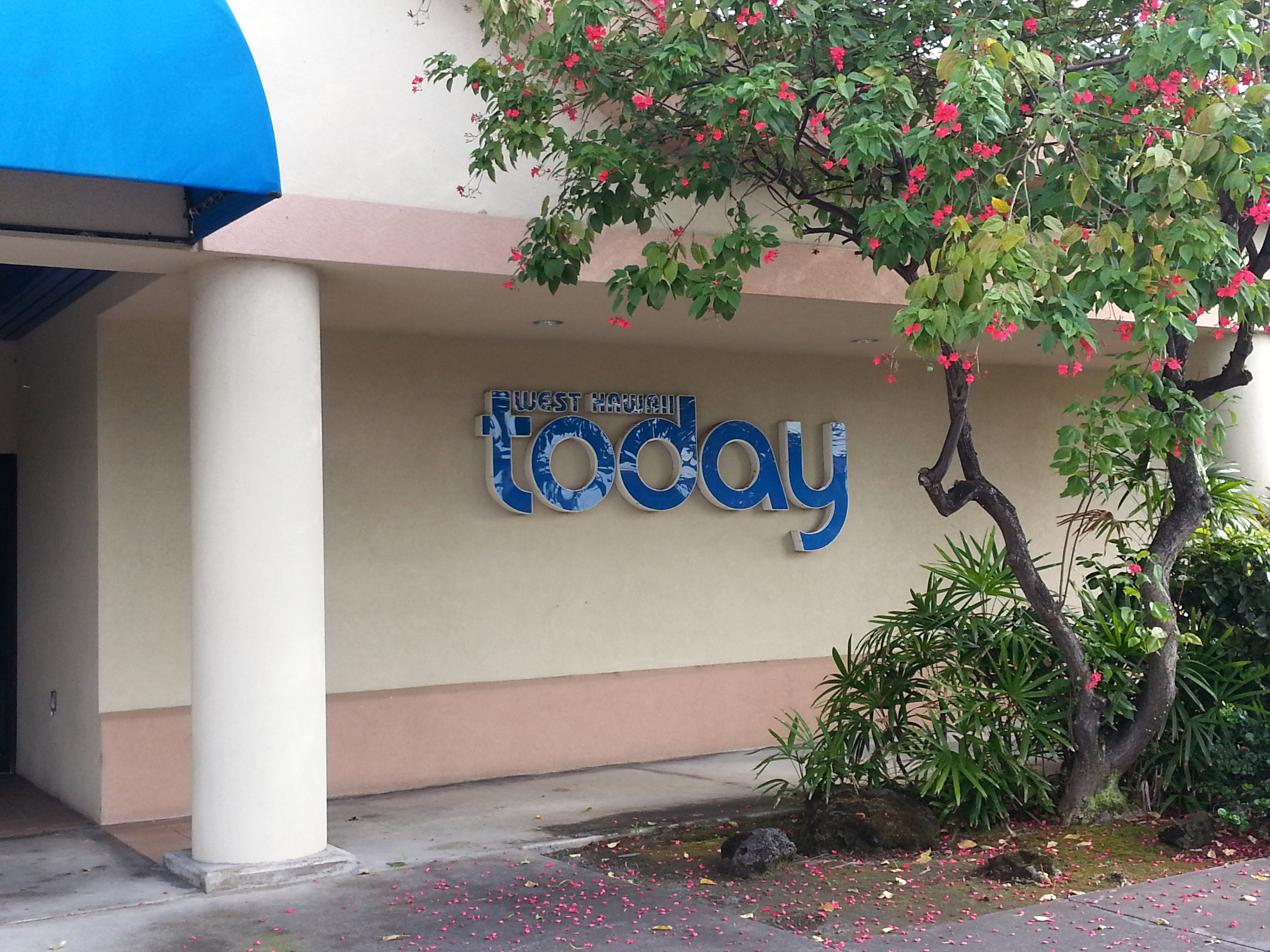
- The Main Office of West Hawaii Today in May 2016.
- Type: Daily newspaper
- Format: Broadsheet
- Owner: Oahu Publications
- Founder(s): Glenn and Sally Maitland
- Founded: 1962
- Headquarters: 75-5580 Kuakini Hwy; Kailuna-Kona, HI 96740; United States
- Circulation: Tuesday: 4,163; Sunday: 5,019 (as of January 2022)
- Sister newspapers: Hawaii Tribune-Herald
- Website: westhawaiitoday.com

West Hawaii Today logo in 2001

West Hawaii Today is a Kailua-Kona, Hawai'i based daily newspaper. It is owned and published by Oahu Publications Inc., a subsidiary of Black Press.

== History ==
In 1962, the Hilo Tribune-Herald launched a weekly Kona edition called the Kona Tribune-Herald. This was expanded six years later into a daily called West Hawaii Today. The paper was owned by Donrey Media Group, whose owner Donald W. Reynolds died in 1993. The company was renamed to Stephens Media in 2002.

In 2014, the Hawaii Tribune-Herald and West Hawaii Today were sold by Stephens Media to Oahu Publications Inc, a subsidiary of Black Press Media, which was acquired by Carpenter Media Group in 2024.

== Subsidiary publications ==
- North Hawaii News, "serving all of North Hawaii". Waimea, Hawaii County, Hawaii. A weekly newspaper, every Thursday.
