= The Daily Herald (Columbia, Tennessee) =

American newspaper

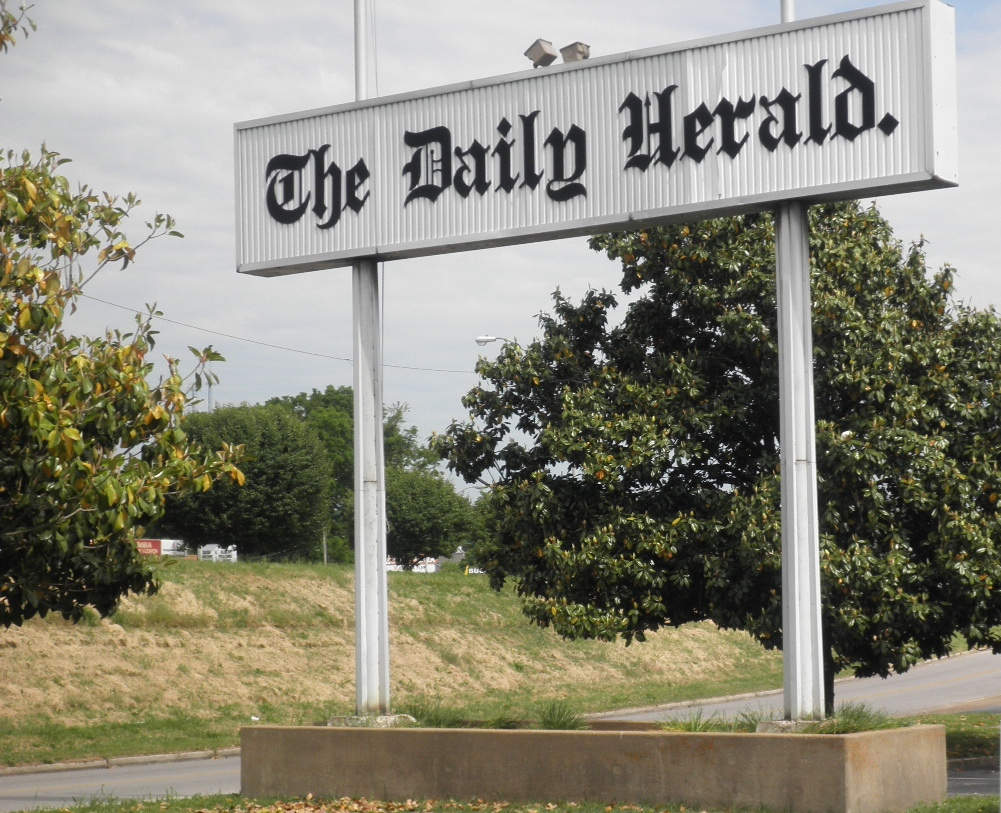
- Type: Daily newspaper
- Format: Broadsheet
- Owner: USA Today Co.
- Publisher: none Ad Director: Local IQ / Gannett
- Editor: Kerri Bartlett
- Founded: 1848
- Language: English
- Headquarters: Current Remote/Co-work space; Past location 1115 South Main Street, which was demolished in 2022 and is now the Maury County Justice Center; Columbia, TN, 38401; United States
- Circulation: 6,933 (as of 2018)
- Website: columbiadailyherald.com

The Daily Herald is a daily newspaper in Columbia, Tennessee. The newspaper is published six days a week Sunday through Friday; the paper does not publish on Saturday. Although it is primarily distributed to Maury County, Tennessee its Newspaper Designated Market (N.D.M.) stretches into five counties in Southern Middle Tennessee. The five county distribution area of The Daily Herald includes: Maury County, Tennessee; Marshall County, Tennessee; Lewis County, Tennessee; and the northern halves of both Giles County, Tennessee, and Lawrence County, Tennessee.

== History ==
The Daily Herald was founded as a weekly newspaper in 1848, when Columbia's population was only 1,700 people. In 1899, the newspaper converted from weekly to daily delivery. The city now has a population 34,811 in 2010 with a county population exceeding 81,956. Weekday circulation (Monday-Friday) is 11,500 and Sunday circulation is 13,500, according to audited figures.

== Ownership ==
In 1916 the newspaper was purchased by Walter D. Hastings and James I. Finney. Beginning in 1965 the newspaper was purchased by local businessman and politician Sam Delk Kennedy who also served as publisher. Kennedy served as either Editor or Publisher or both from 1965 to 1983. It was acquired by the Donrey Media Group (founder Donald W. Reynolds) in 1983. Reynolds died in 1993. The company was then sold to the Stephens family of Arkansas, best known for their investment banking business Stephens Inc. in Little Rock, Arkansas. After Stephens acquired the group, some of Donrey's properties were sold off, and the company moved its headquarters to Las Vegas, home of its largest newspaper, the Las Vegas Review-Journal. The company was renamed Stephens Media Group in 2002. Most of Stephens newspapers operated in small to medium-sized towns and cities, but the company also owns the Las Vegas Review-Journal, a 186,000 circulation newspaper.

In June 2006 the company became officially known as Stephens Media LLC and continued Mr. Reynolds' business philosophy of locally operated companies. Stephens Media LLC was a Nevada diversified media holding company that published over 11 daily and 64 weekly newspapers in nine states, primarily in Nevada and Arkansas.

In 2015, the Stephens Media newspapers were sold to New Media Investment Group. GateHouse Media a wholly owned subsidiary of New Media Investment Group that will be managing the portfolio of 125 Daily Newspapers and 575 Weekly Newspapers in 32 states throughout the U. S.

== Recent publishers ==
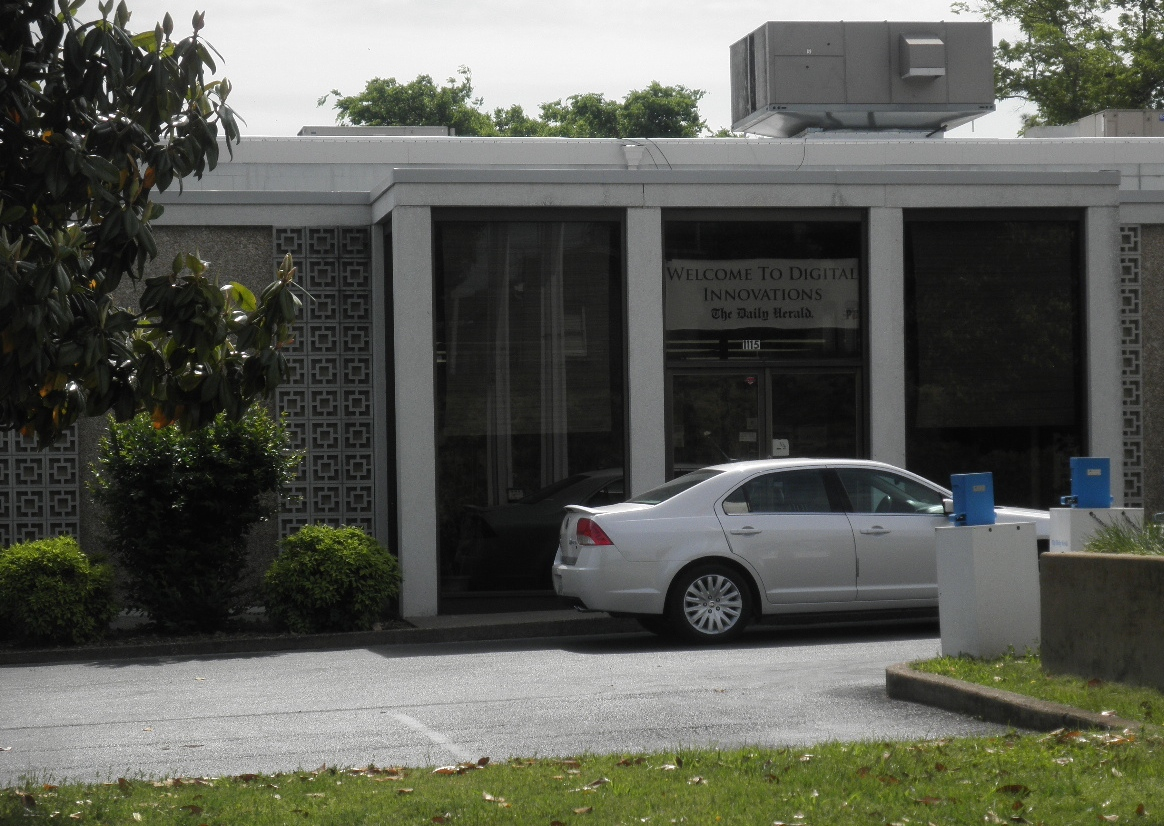
Offices of The Daily Herald in Columbia, Tennessee

Sam Kennedy served as the newspaper's publisher during the decades of the 1960s through 1983. Douglas Beel (from Arkansas) became the newspaper's publisher from 1983 until 1996. In 1996, Mark Palmer (from Oklahoma) was named publisher. Keith Ponder served as Publisher from October 2015 to April 2020. James Bennett served as editor from 2014 to September 2020. Major department heads at the newspaper currently include; Editor Kerri Bartlett since Dec. 28, 2020, Advertising Director is under the management of Local IQ/ Gannett. Advertiser News of Spring Hill, sister publication, is no longer in publication as of fall 2023.

== Subsidiary publications ==
- The Advertiser News {Weekly} (Spring Hill & Thompson's Station, Tennessee) No longer in publication.
- The Value Guide {Weekly} (Maury County, Tennessee)
- Spring Hill Life {Quarterly} (Spring Hill, Tennessee)
- Healthy Living {Monthly} (Six Counties in Southern Middle Tennessee)
