= Righthaven LLC v. Democratic Underground LLC =

2011 US copyright infringement case

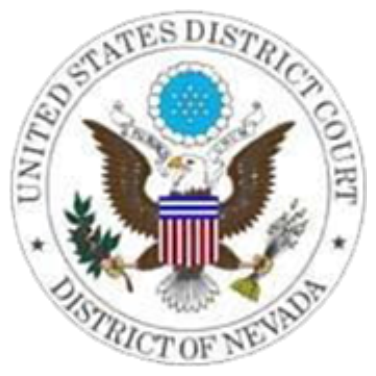
- Court: United States District Court for the District of Nevada
- Full case name: Righthaven LLC, a Nevada limited-liability company v. Democratic Underground, a District of Columbia limited-liability company; and David Allen, an individual
- Decided: June 14, 2011
- Docket nos.: 2:10-cv-01356
- Citations: 791 F. Supp. 2d 968; 99 U.S.P.Q.2d 1095; 39 Med. L. Rptr. 1935

Holding
- Righthaven's complaint was dismissed in its entirety for lack of standing. Righthaven was further ordered to show cause in writing why it should not be sanctioned for misrepresentation to the court.

Court membership
- Judge sitting: Roger L. Hunt

Righthaven LLC. v. Democratic Underground LLC, 791 F. Supp. 2d 968 (D. Nev. 2011), was a copyright infringement case which determined that a contract giving a party right to sue on behalf of a copyright holder does not give the party legal standing to file such lawsuits. This case is one of over 200 similar cases filed by Righthaven against media outlets using content from Stephens Media. Judge Roger L. Hunt ruled that Righthaven lacked standing to file a copyright infringement suit and ordered Righthaven to show cause within two weeks why it should not be sanctioned for failure to disclose Stephens Media as an interested party.

== Background ==
Democratic Underground (DU) is a website devoted to disseminating and discussing political news and progressive principles. It is run by David Allen. On May 13, 2010, a DU user identified by the name "Pampango" posted a portion of an article from the Las Vegas Review-Journal about the polling status of several candidates running in the Republican Senate primary in Nevada. The excerpt posted contained 5 of the article's 50 sentences and linked back to the Las Vegas Review-Journal's website.

Righthaven was a copyright holding company founded in 2010. It searched the Internet for snippets from its partners' publications posted to third-party websites. Once it found such a snippet, it registered the copyright for that article, obtained a "partial assignment" of copyright from the true rightholder, and then threatened to sue the owner of the third-party website for considerable sums while offering to settle out of court for smaller sums. Righthaven and Stephens Media formed a contract in which Stephens Media assigned Righthaven a "right to sue" third parties without assigning the actual copyright. Righthaven would then file lawsuits or accept an out-of-court settlement, sharing a percentage of the proceeds with Stephens Media.

== Proceedings ==
On August 10, 2010, Righthaven filed a lawsuit against Democratic Underground, LLC and David Allen, alleging that Democratic Underground and David Allen were liable for copyright infringement of works to which Righthaven owns a copyright and seeking injunctive relief and statutory damages.

On September 27, 2010, Democratic Underground filed a counterclaim, arguing that Democratic Underground was not responsible for the posting, and that the excerpt posted to the site was a fair use. Democratic Underground sought favorable judgment and attorney's fees, and demanded a jury trial for all triable issues of fact.

On November 15, 2010, Righthaven moved to voluntarily dismiss the case with prejudice. This would avoid having a ruling on the case that could set a precedent for its other cases.

On December 7, Democratic Underground requested that the court deny the motion for dismissal and grant summary judgment in DU's favor.

== Court decision ==
On June 14, 2011, Judge Roger L. Hunt found that Stephens Media had not transferred any copyrights to Righthaven, but merely a "right to sue," which is not a transferable right under copyright law. Since Righthaven did not own the copyright for which it was filing the lawsuit, Hunt dismissed the case for lack of standing. In addition, since Righthaven had failed to identify Stephens Media as a financially interested party, Hunt ordered Righthaven to show cause why it should not be sanctioned for "flagrant misrepresentation to the Court."

On July 15, 2011, Hunt ruled that Righthaven misrepresented its relationship with Stephens Media and Stephens Media's financial interest in the lawsuit, and sanctioned it $5,000. Righthaven was further ordered to file the transcript of the ruling in all the hundreds of other copyright cases it had brought forth against other parties in Nevada.

After requesting and receiving a stay of the monetary sanction, Righthaven sought another extension which the court did not grant.

== Public response ==
This ruling was widely reported on by various blogs, where it was generally well received. The case has been widely regarded as a legal victory against copyright trolls.

The suit was the first of several major losses for Righthaven on grounds that it lacked standing to sue, and was ordered to pay the attorneys' fees of several of its defendants. Unable to pay those fees and sanctions, Righthaven was forced into receivership later in 2011.

== See also ==
- Copyright assignment
- Digital Millennium Copyright Act (DMCA)
