= Fenwick & West =

American law firm

Fenwick & West LLP
- Headquarters: Silicon Valley Center; Mountain View, California
- No. of offices: 7
- No. of attorneys: 478
- Major practice areas: Corporate, intellectual property, litigation, regulatory, tax
- Key people: Richard Dickson, Chairman; Dawn Belt, Managing Partner
- Revenue: $792,744,000 (2024)
- Date founded: 1972
- Company type: Limited liability partnership
- Website: www.fenwick.com

Fenwick & West LLP, now known as Fenwick, is a law firm of more than 500 attorneys with offices in Silicon Valley, San Francisco, Seattle, New York City, Santa Monica, Washington, DC, and Boston. The firm focuses on the technology and life sciences sectors, advising clients at all stages from startups to public companies. The firm's practice areas include capital markets, mergers and acquisitions, venture capital, patents, commercial litigation, and regulatory counseling.

== History ==
In 1972, William Fenwick, a graduate of Vanderbilt University Law School, formed Fenwick & West with three partners while an associate at Cleary Gottlieb. Early clients included Pioneer Electronics and Apple Computer, which the firm incorporated in 1974.

In 1976, the firm wrote the first shrinkwrap (contract law) license agreement, where use of a product was considered acceptance of the contracts that came with it. In the '80s and '90s, the firm established the first copyright for a graphic interface, one of the first business method software patents, and the first cleanroom protocols to protect software Intellectual property.

Fenwick also advised on early technology initial public offerings, including EBay's IPO in 1998 and Oracle's IPO in 1986.

In 2025, Fenwick signed an amicus brief supporting law firm Perkins Coie after it and other law firms were targeted by the Trump administration.

== Recognition ==
Fenwick & West ranked 69th on the 2025 AmLaw 100 list of the largest law firms by revenue.

Chambers and Partners recognized Fenwick's practice areas in startups, capital markets, artificial intelligence, and intellectual property.

== Milestones ==
=== 2025 ===
- Fenwick represented Wiz in its pending $32B acquisition by Google.
- Fenwick represented Informatica in its $8B acquisition by Salesforce.
- Fenwick represented Niantic in its pending $3.5B acquisition by Scopely and Public Investment Fund.
- Fenwick represented Redfin its pending $1.75B acquisition by Rocket Companies.
- Fenwick represented DX in its $1B agreement to be acquired by Atlassian.
- Fenwick represented Wonder Group in its pending $650M acquisition of Grubhub.
- Fenwick represented IPOs for Coreweave at $1.5B, Figma at $1.2B, and Wealthfront at $485M.
- Fenwick were underwriters in Navan's $923M IPO.
- Fenwick represented the following in funding rounds: Databricks in $4B Series L and Metropolis Technologies for $1.6B.

=== 2024 ===
- Fenwick represented Shockwave Medical in its approximately $13.1B sale to Johnson & Johnson.
- Fenwick represented Smartsheet Inc. in its $8.4B acquisition by Blackstone and Vista Equity Partners.
- Fenwick represented Alpine Immune Sciences in its roughly $4.9B acquisition by Vertex Pharmaceuticals.
- Fenwick represented Model N (company) in its $1.25M acquisition by Vista Equity Partners.
- Fenwick represented Coinbase in its upsized $1.1B offering of 0.25% convertible notes due 2030.
- Fenwick won patent infringement cases for Lashify, Meril Life Sciences and Yuga Labs, makers of Bored Ape.
- Fenwick represented Morphic in its $3.2B acquisition by Eli Lilly.

=== 2023 ===
- Fenwick represented DICE Therapeutics in its roughly $2.4B acquisition by Eli Lilly.
- Fenwick represented Chinook Therapeutics in its $3.5B acquisition by Novartis.
- Fenwick represented Alteryx in its $4.4B acquisition by Clearlake Capital.
- Fenwick represented Royalty Pharma in up to $1.1B of drug patent acquisitions.
- Fenwick represented Metropolis Technologies in $1.5B financing round for acquiring SP Plus Corporation.
- Fenwick represented SomaLogic in its merger agreement with Standard BioTools.

=== 2022 ===
- Fenwick represented The New York Times in its acquisition of the online word game Wordle.
- Fenwick represented Figma in its attempted acquisition by Adobe.
- Fenwick represented Clif Bar & Company in its acquisition by Mondelēz International for $2.9 billion.
- Fenwick represented Vocera in its $2.97B acquisition by Stryker Corporation.
- Fenwick won an IP-infringement cade for Amazon (company) over video-on-demand patents.
- Fenwick represented Securonix in a $1B investment round.

=== 2021 ===
- Fenwick represented Coinbase on its direct listing on Nasdaq, the company was later charged by the SEC for unregistered securities.
- Fenwick represented IPOs for SentinelOne ($1.4B) and GitLab Inc. ($80M), as well as public listings for BuzzFeed and Nextdoor.
- Fenwick represented Glu Mobile in its $2.4B acquisition by Electronic Arts, Bill.com in its $2.5B acquisition of Divvy and Amunix in its $1.2B acquisition by Sanofi.
- Fenwick supported financing rounds for Devoted Health ($1.15B, Series D) and Relativity Space ($650M, Series E).

=== 2020 ===
- Fenwick represented Amazon in the E.D. Texas, where a jury found that Amazon's Alexa-powered smart home devices did not infringe patents held by Innovation Sciences and that these patents were invalid.
- Fenwick represented Robinhood in its $660M Series G financing round.
- Fenwick represented Lululemon in its $500M acquisition of MIRROR.
- Fenwick represented OSIsoft, in real-time industrial data software and services, in its $5B acquisition by AVEVA, in industrial software.
- Fenwick negotiated for Seattle Genetics to commercialize two of its oncology drugs in partnership with Merck & Co.

=== 2019 ===
- Fenwick represented Loxo Oncology, with offices in South San Francisco, in its $8B cash acquisition by Eli Lilly.

=== 2014 ===
- Fenwick represented WhatsApp in its $16 billion acquisition by Facebook.

=== 2012 ===
- Fenwick represented Facebook in its $1 billion purchase of Instagram.
- Fenwick represented Facebook in its IPO, the largest Internet IPO in U.S. history.

=== 2011 ===
- Fenwick was pro bono counsel to Democratic Underground in Righthaven LLC v. Democratic Underground LLC, which is widely regarded as a legal victory against copyright trolls and called Copyright Case of the Year by Managing Intellectual Property.

=== 2000 ===
- Fenwick handled VeriSign's $21 billion acquisition of Network Solutions, the largest internet merger in history.
