= Dixon Tribune =

Weekly newspaper published in Dixon, California

- Type: Weekly newspaper
- Owner(s): Gibson Radio and Publishing
- Founder: R.D. Hopkins
- Founded: 1874
- Ceased publication: 2024
- Language: English
- Headquarters: Dixon, California
- ISSN: 0739-0181
- OCLC number: 9689477

The Dixon Tribune was a weekly newspaper published in Dixon, California, from 1874 to 2024.

== History ==
On November 14, 1874, R.D. Hopkins first published the Dixon Tribune. Hopkins grew ill two years later, and briefly handed editorship over to a Mr. Lee, until selling the business in April 1877 to Alfred B. Nye, formerly of the Vallejo Chronicle.

In September 1881, Edward E. Leake purchased the Tribune, and in November 1891, he acquired the Daily Democrat. In April 1892, Leake sold the Tribune to Arthur L. Henry and Robert E. Willot. At some point Frederick A. Hutton bought out Willot and in February 1898 bought out Henry too. At that time the paper's affiliation switched from Democratic to Republican.

The Tribune was acquired by Rowland Moss in 1903, H.W. Bessac, formerly of the Lincoln News Messenger, in 1906, and Fred G. Dunnicliff, formerly of the White Salmon Enterprise, in 1913. He published the Tribune until retiring in 1947, abd passed it down to his two sons, Fred N. and Dean, who operated the Dixon paper together until 1962, when Dean Dunnicliff bought The Healdsburg Tribune. In 1977, Gordon Gojkovich bought the paper from Fred N. and Louise Dunnicliff. In 1985, Luther E. Gibson, owner of the Martinez News-Gazette and former owner of the Vallejo Times Herald, acquired the Tribune. At that time circulation was 4,000. In 1988, Gibson died. His company, Gibson Radio and Publishing Co. continued to operate the paper. On January 31, 2024, the Tribune published its final edition.
