= Albert Edmunds Cahlan =

Newspaper publisher in Las Vegas

- Born: April 8, 1899; Reno, Nevada, U.S.
- Died: June 1968 (aged 69); Las Vegas, Nevada, U.S.
- Resting place: Palm Desert Memorial
- Other name: A. E. Cahlan
- Occupations: Newspaper publisher; Newspaper editor
- Years active: 1926–60
- Spouse: Ruth Estella Schuyler (1901–1980) (married October 22, 1922)
- Children: Marion Cahlan-Henderson; John Forest (Frosty) Cahlan
- Parents: Albert (Bert) Wallace Cahlan (1871–1933); Marion Elizabeth Edmunds (1875–1966)
- Family: John Francis Cahlan (brother)

Albert Edmunds Cahlan, aka A. E. Cahlan or Al Cahlan (April 8, 1899– June 1968) was an American newspaper publisher and prominent civic leader during the mid-20th century in the forming of Las Vegas. During his lifetime, he was best known for his unabashed approach to the politics of mid-century Las Vegas, which he often wrote about in his daily column.

== Biography ==
Cahlan was the son of Albert (Bert) Wallace Cahlan (1871–1933) a prominent Reno, Nevada, newspaperman in his own right, and Marion Elizabeth Edmunds (1875–1966) a Virginia City school teacher and for whom the Marion E. Cahlan Elementary School was named. Cahlan had one brother three years his junior, John Francis Cahlan (1902–1987) with whom he would work with in the newspaper business his entire life, for whom the Cahlan Research Library in Las Vegas is named. He attended Reno High School and sought an Electrical Engineering degree from University of Nevada at Reno. However, his ultimate path led him in the printing and publishing business, and he never used his engineering education as an occupation. In his early years, he took various jobs from working on the railroad to the Nevada Highway Department. He, also like his mother, had a penchant for teaching, and when he first moved to Las Vegas he did indeed teach math at the Las Vegas High school in the mid-to-late 1920s. It was there he met his wife, also a school teacher at the old Las Vegas Grammar School. He married Ruth Estella Schuyler, daughter of William Norton Schuyler and Emma Mary Schaefle, on October 22, 1922, in Las Vegas. The Cahlan's had two children. A daughter, Ruth Marion, was born in Las Vegas, she married one Milton M Henderson, and the family subsequently removed to Iowa and made their home there. They also had a son John "Frosty" Forest Cahlan an attorney in Pahrump, Nevada, until his death. He had three children.

== Newspaper ==
Cahlan was one of the most influential newspapermen in Las Vegas history.

A.D. Hopkins writes in his story of 'The First 100', "Between 1926 and 1960 he [Al Cahlan] transformed a 300-circulation weekly into a daily boasting 27,000 subscribers, the largest in the state. The newspaper he built, now known as the Las Vegas Review-Journal". "In 1926 Frank Garside, a publisher who had operated newspapers in Tonopah and other mining boom towns, saw a similar opportunity in the news that a huge dam would be built near Las Vegas. He bought the Clark County Review, a struggling Las Vegas weekly, and brought in Al Cahlan to run it. Al Cahlan became his partner."

=== Deal with Donald Reynolds ===
In 1949, Cahlan found a new co-owner when Garside opposed expenditures on new equipment. Don Reynolds bought the R-J, and Cahlan remained managing director, with an agreement that either could buy out the other. In the 1950s, Cahlan's political influence declined with McCarran's death and the arrival of a competitor, the Las Vegas Sun, whose publisher, Hank Greenspun, regularly attacked Cahlan and his allies in his own front-page column, "Where I Stand." The name was no coincidence. In fact, Greenspun had intended to call his column "From Where I Stand," but the first word fell off on the way to the composing room.

With the Sun catching up in circulation, Reynolds exercised his option. On December 11, 1960, he bought out Cahlan, who, along with his column, was gone from the R-J the next day. There has been some uncertainty about the paper's ownership. Cahlan sold to Reynolds in 1961, but sources disagree about whether he owned one-third or one-fourth of the paper. See also Coughtry,"Cahlan," 361; Las Vegas Sun, October 17, 1987.

== Politics ==
Cahlan immersed himself in politics as an assemblyman, a Colorado River commissioner, a Democratic party official, and a close friend of U.S. Senator Pat McCarran. He apparently received serious consideration to be appointed to succeed U.S. Senator Key Pittman when Pittman died in office in 1940. Delegate to Democratic National Convention from Nevada, 1948.

== Honors ==
- Nevada Newspaper Hall of Fame
- Distinguished Nevadan Recipient 1966
- Cahlan Drive, Las Vegas, NV named for A.E. Cahlan
