= Daily Democrat =

Newspaper in Woodland, California, United States

- Type: Daily newspaper
- Format: Broadsheet
- Owner: Digital First Media
- Founder(s): W. L. Jernegan; M. E. Everts
- Publisher: Mazi Kavoosi
- Editor: Carlos Guerrero
- Founded: 1857
- Language: English
- Headquarters: Woodland, California
- ISSN: 0747-1890
- Website: dailydemocrat.com

The Daily Democrat is the daily newspaper in Woodland, California. The paper is owned by Digital First Media. It is the oldest paper published in Yolo County, California.

== History ==
In 1857, the weekly newspaper Yolo County Democrat was founded in Cacheville by William L. Jernegan and M. E. Everts. Samuel Ruland served as the paper's first editor. After about three months Everts withdrew and the paper ceased after a year. M. P. Ferguson acquired the property and revived the paper in 1859 as The Cacheville Spectator. That same year ownership transferred to T. J. Howard.

Howard relocated the paper to Knights Landing and published under the title The Knights News in August 1859 with S. L. Snyder as co-publisher and co-proprietor. The paper shuttered after eight days. Two months later S. W. Ravely revived the paper and resumed printing that November under the old name. The paper moved to Woodland on June 11, 1864 and the name was changed to the Woodland News.

In August 1865, the paper came under the ownership of H. C. Grover and Charles E. St. Louis. At that time the paper switched party affiliations from Democrat to Republican. W. A. Henry became editor in November 1867 and the name was changed back to the Yolo County Democrat. Two years later and Henry was succeeded by L.P Hall, who ran the paper until a libel suit from the Yolo Mail caused him to retire. William Saunders become the paper's sole owner by February 1870 and ran it for a decade. The name was changed again on June 1, 1877 to the Woodland Daily Democrat. The paper was briefly owned by Ruffner & Lee, who sold out to Wick B. Parsons in 1887.

In 1891, Edward E. Leake, editor of the Dixon Tribune purchased the paper. In 1926, Leake died. His son Paul R. Leake then took over as publisher and died in 1977. His son Kenneth E. Leake then worked as publisher until his death in 1981. At that time his widow Eleanor Leake published the paper. In 1983, P.R. Leake was posthumously inducted into the California Newspaper Hall of Fame. In total, the Leake family owned the Daily Democrat for 92 years until 1984, when it was sold to the Donrey Media Group. Donrey ceded control of the paper to the California Newspapers Partnership in 1999. The company is owned by MediaNews Group, Inc.
