= Southern California News Group =

Group of local newspapers in Los Angeles

- Company type: Private
- Industry: Media
- Headquarters: Irvine, California, U.S.
- Products: Newspaper; Online newspaper
- Owner: MediaNews Group
- Website: socalnewsgroup.com

The Southern California News Group (SCNG), formerly the San Gabriel Valley News Group and the Los Angeles News Group, is an umbrella group of local daily newspapers published in the Greater Los Angeles area of Southern California by Digital First Media, which is owned by the hedge fund Alden Global Capital.

== History ==
Originally named the San Gabriel Valley News Group (SGVN), the organization was formed as an umbrella name for MediaNews Group–operated newspapers in the Los Angeles area. SGVN began when MediaNews Group purchased the Pasadena Star-News, San Gabriel Valley Tribune, and Whittier Daily News from Thomson Corporation in 1996. Thomson had already operated all three newspapers as a unit, sharing news and sports sections among the three papers (which cover geographically adjacent territories) with different story placement based on the region being served. Subsequently, in 1997 the Long Beach Press-Telegram was purchased from Knight-Ridder and in 1998 the Los Angeles Daily News was purchased from Jack Kent Cooke, and the organization was renamed the Los Angeles News Group (LANG). In 1999, LANG acquired three newspapers in the Inland Empire – the Inland Valley Daily Bulletin serving the Pomona Valley/Ontario area and Redlands Daily Facts from Donrey Media, and The San Bernardino Sun from Gannett. Finally, in 2006, LANG acquired the Daily Breeze serving the South Bay area of Los Angeles County from Copley Press.

On March 21, 2016, a bankruptcy judge approved the sale of Freedom Communications and its two major newspapers, the Orange County Register and the Riverside Press-Enterprise to Digital First Media. Thus, LANG was renamed Southern California News Group. The sale closed on March 31, 2016. Reports from former Freedom Communications writers began appearing in other SCNG newspapers, and vice versa, the next day.

The news coverage of the newspapers are mainly local and state stories, including Los Angeles area news provided by City News Service. The newspapers contain some national and international news, often from the Associated Press. The newspapers share coverage and printing presses, with a central copy editing and design desk, and staff writers file the same stories for all members of the group, including sharing sports beat writers, which has caused controversy. The newspapers also share editorials and speak as one voice on regional issues.

== Newspapers ==
The newspapers include:

- Daily Breeze – Torrance and the South Bay (acquired from the San Diego–based Copley Press in 2007)
- Inland Valley Daily Bulletin – Pomona Valley and Ontario; originally were two separate papers: the Pomona Progress-Bulletin and the Ontario Daily Report (merged in 1990; acquired in 1999 from Donrey)
- Press-Telegram – Long Beach serving the greater Long Beach area
- Los Angeles Daily News – Los Angeles metropolitan area (San Fernando Valley) and Northern Los Angeles County, and the flagship newspaper of the group.
- Orange County Register – serving Orange County, California
- Pasadena Star-News – Pasadena serving the greater Pasadena area
- Redlands Daily Facts – Redlands (acquired in 1999 from Donrey) serving the Redlands area
- The Press-Enterprise – Riverside serving western and central Riverside County
- The San Bernardino Sun – San Bernardino County serving the San Bernardino Valley
- San Gabriel Valley Tribune – Monrovia serving the central and east San Gabriel Valley
- Whittier Daily News – Whittier serving the Greater Whittier area
- San Diego Union Tribune serving San Diego County (purchased in July 2023)

Also included are the community weeklies, which include the Palos Verdes Peninsula News and The Beach Reporter, which publishes on Thursdays with the Daily Breeze, the Gazette weeklies cover the Long Beach neighborhoods north and east of downtown, also on Thursdays. The Orange County Register publishes a total of 17 community weeklies covering most of Orange County, with the exception of Santa Ana.

Spanish-language weeklies include Excelsior, which have two editions for Los Angeles and Orange counties and La Prensa, which covers the Inland Empire.

The inland newspapers (Daily Bulletin, Daily Facts, Press-Enterprise, and Sun) are further subdivided into the Inland Newspapers Group with combined business operations. The former SGVN newspapers are also operated as an integrated business unit, out of the San Gabriel Valley Tribune offices in Monrovia (with the Pasadena office serving as a bureau for the greater Pasadena area). The Daily Breeze and Press-Telegram also have integrated business operations. The union for the Press-Telegram, which was inherited from Knight-Ridder operation, has criticized the demotion of the Press-Telegram Long Beach offices to a bureau, with most work done out of the Daily Breeze in Torrance. In 2021, journalists at all SCNG newspapers organized under the NewsGuild-CWA, and ratified their first contract in November 2024. A compensation study in 2022 found that the median compensation of bargaining unit employees was $51,300, which would be considered low income under federal guidelines for a single person household.

Prior to the merger with the Freedom newspapers, LANG identified themselves as editions of the Los Angeles Daily News in order to make LANG a "Top Ten" media buy as ranked by the Alliance for Audited Media. The combined readership of SCNG newspapers is 3.8 million, which if combined would make it the third largest newspaper group in the country. Effective April 1, 2018, all ten daily newspapers covering Los Angeles, Riverside and San Bernardino counties, along with seventeen community weeklies covering Orange County now identify themselves as editions of the Register on the front page.

On July 10, 2023, SCNG announced it had purchased the San Diego Union Tribune from billionaire owner, Dr. Patrick Soon-Shiong, for an undisclosed amount.

All SCNG newspapers, as well as the Los Angeles Times, various community newspapers, and regional editions of the New York Times and Wall Street Journal, are printed from the Press-Enterprise printers in Riverside.
