= The Beach Reporter =

Weekly newspaper in California, United States

- Type: Weekly newspaper
- Format: Broadsheet
- Owner(s): Southern California News Group (MediaNews Group)
- Founder: Richard Frank
- Publisher: Simon Grieve
- Editor: Lisa Jacobs
- Founded: 1977
- Language: English
- Headquarters: 2615 Pacific Coast Highway; Suite 329; Hermosa Beach, California 90254 United States
- Website: tbrnews.com

The Beach Reporter is a weekly newspaper serving the Beach Cities of Los Angeles's South Bay. It primarily focuses on the cities of Manhattan Beach, Hermosa Beach, Redondo Beach, and El Segundo. It is published every Thursday, with a circulation of approximately 55,000. It is considered a primary source of local news and events, as well as a guide to local real estate listings, covering some of the most expensive and active areas in California.

== History ==
In 1977, Richard Frank founded the Beach Reporter. He sold it if or $2.5 million in March 1989 to Baker Communications Inc., owned by Seth H. Baker. The business also owned the Palos Verdes Peninsula News. After the sale, the Reporters expanded its coverage area and got into direct competition and a legal battle with the Easy Reader. At that time the paper had a circulation of 45,000. Baker filled for Chapter 11 Bankruptcy in 1995. The Reporter and News were then acquired for $2.7 million by Stephen C. Laxineta's National Media, Inc.

In 2003, Copley Press, owner of the Daily Breeze, bought both papers. In December 2006, the paper was sold by Copley Press to the Hearst Corporation in a complex transaction that left the paper under the day-to-day control of Dean Singleton's MediaNews Group and its subsidiary, the Los Angeles Newspaper Group (LANG). Singleton announced that he would fold the paper into the LANG operations, but not cut salaries. Singleton will eventually come to own the Reporter under a 2007 plan to acquire ownership of the paper as part of a swap with Hearst in which Hearst would trade some California papers and the St. Paul Pioneer Press for an increased stake in Singleton's non-California operations.
