= Chico Enterprise-Record =

Newspaper in Chico, California

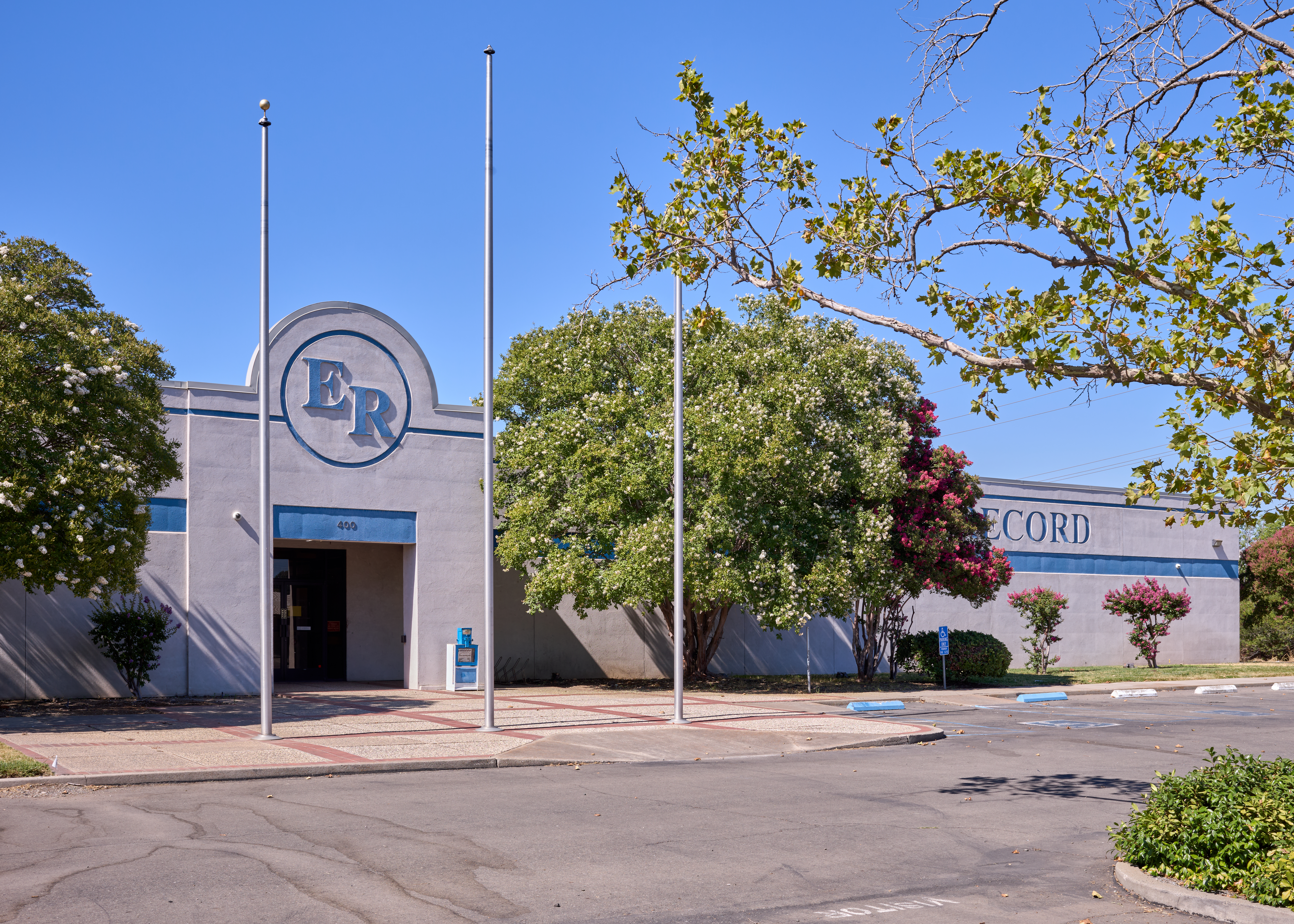
- Type: Daily newspaper
- Format: Broadsheet
- Owner: Digital First Media
- Founder: C.W. Stiles
- Publisher: Mazi Kavoosi
- Editor: Mike Wolcott
- Founded: Nov. 12, 1853 (as the Butte Record)
- Language: English
- Headquarters: 400 E. Park Ave. Chico, California; United States
- Circulation: under 10,000
- Sister newspapers: Oroville Mercury-Register
- ISSN: 0746-5548
- OCLC number: 232117652
- Website: chicoer.com

The Chico Enterprise-Record is the daily newspaper of Chico, California. Also known as the E-R, the newspaper was first published in Bidwell Bar, California as the Butte Record in 1853 and has been owned by the MediaNews Group corporation since 1999. The paper has a circulation of less than 10,000 Editions of the Enterprise-Record include the Oroville Mercury-Register.

The Enterprise-Record is the result of the merger of the Chico Enterprise and the Chico Record on Dec. 6, 1948. Both predecessor publications had a long and storied history throughout the north valley of the Sacramento River.

== History ==
=== Chico Record ===
The first edition of the Butte Record was published in Bidwell's Bar, California, on Nov. 12, 1853. The first publisher was C.W. Stiles, who hired Harry De Courcey as first editor and L.P Hall as first printer. The two workers didn't get along and soon after launching De Courcey severely stabbed Hall in the shoulder with a knife. The editor went to jail and Stiles hired hotel owner George H. Crossette to replace him. In February 1854, after working at the paper for a few weeks, Crossette trade his hotel and a ranch to Stiles for ownership of the Record. Crossette was known as "a bitter partisan" who denounced political opponents in his paper. In 1856, he moved the Record to Oroville after the county seat was relocated to that city. At that time Crossette expanded the paper to a daily and absorbed rival papers The Northern Californian and The Butte Democrat, which shared an owner.

In 1864, Crossette sold the Butte Record to James Wagstaff, owner of the Oroville Union. He merged the two papers to form the Oroville Union Record. In 1866, Crossette repurchased the paper and changed the name back to the Butte Record. By 1873, the mining boom in the area declined so Crossette moved the paper again, this time to Chico where the agriculture industry was growing. Crossette teamed up with J.F. Linthium to relaunch the paper as the Daily Butte Record. In September 1887, Crossette sold the Daily Record to Rev. James Wood, who a few days later bought the Chico Morning Chronicle from Frank W. Brown and A. J. Walker. The Chronicle was founded by Brown in June 1881 and Walker bought a half-interest in March 1883. Following the sale, Wood merged his two papers to form the Chico Chronicle-Record. It was a Democrat paper.

Walker became a co-owner at some point and sold his interest back to Wood in December 1894. At that time Wood leased the Chronicle-Record to for a year V.C. Richards, who previously worked as a reporter for the San Jose Mercury. Wood's son Ernest E Wood tried running the paper for a few months. It was then leased for year to C. W. Clough. Richards moved back to Gridley after his mother got sick and met Charles H. Deuel, who worked as editor of the Gridley Herald. On April 2, 1897, two young men, Richards and Deuel, bought the paper from Wood with help from a family loan. The two bought a new type and made several improvements to the Chronicle-Record. On May 10, 1897, the name was changed to The Chico Daily Record. Deuel went on to serve 22 years in the California legislature. In 1945, Stanley Beaubaire and Keith Topping, publishers of the Hanford Sentinel, bought the Record. They soon changed the name to the Chico Morning Record.

=== Chico Enterprise ===
On Nov, 11, 1865, A. W. Bishop published the first edition of The Chico Courant. Bishop previously worked at the Red Bluff Independent with Watson C. Chalmers, who that same year sold the paper to come work at the Sacramento Record Union for a year before becoming the business manager at the Courant. In July 1867, C.H. Wilson founded the Butte County Press in Chico. Ownership changed that November to R. H. O'Farrel, Chico's public auctioneer. He was succeeded by L. P. Hall, first editor of the Butte Record, who changed the paper's name to the California Caucasian in order to capitalize on anti-Chinese sentiments. It ceased in March 1869.

In April 1869, Captain W. N. DeHaven, assisted by his son Harry DeHaven, published the first edition of The Northern Enterprise in Chico. It was founded after DeHaven purchased the assets of the Courant and the Caucasian. In April 1971, DeHaven sold the paper to Dr. W. P. Tilden, a one time superintendent of an insane asylum in Stockton. The paper then became Democrat. Later that year on October 11, Chalmers the Chico Weekly Review. It was later renamed The Chico Semi-Weekly Review and operated for six months. Tilden sold out in May 1872.

The new owner of the Enterprise was Ed. Hoole, Esq., who also bought the Review and merged the two together to form the Chico Enterprise. DeHaven was named editor and the paper became Republican. DeHaven died on March 12, 1876, and Chalmers became the paper's editor and manager. The Enterprise expanded to a semi-weekly on March 28, 1880, and then became a daily on May 26, 1882. Chalmers succeeded Hoole as owner of the Enterprise. He retired on January 1, 1895, and leased the paper to C. F. Small. Chalmers owned the Enterprise until his death on March 5, 1899. His granddaughter Miss E. May Loy then handled his estate and the paper. She sold it March 1903 to Bert Sauber and B. F. Arnold.

In March 1906, Colonel E. A. Forbes, publisher of the Marysville Appeal, bought the Enterprise from Sauber and Arnold. That same month, Forbes bought the five-month-old Chico Post, and merged it with the Enterprise, which briefly became known as the Enterprise-Post. That December, Forbes bought the The Sacramento Union, but sold a few months later. In July 1908, Forbes sold his two-thirds stake in the Enterprise to John S. Briscoe, the paper's managing editor who already owned a one third stake, and Florence J. O'Brien, formerly of The Sacramento Union. O'Brien owned the Enterprise for 36 years until retiring. He ran for public office several times but lost, partly due to voters mistaking him for a woman due to his name. O'Brien sold the business on Sept. 12, 1944, to Chet J. Dahl, the paper's advertising and business manager, and Alfred W. Bramwell, who owned a local drug store. A few months later Dahl died suddenly of a heart attack while on a hunting trip and Bramwell then took on the entire operation. A.H. "Al" Weibel was then hired as publisher and later died in 1950.

=== Enterprise-Record ===
On Oct. 2, 1946, the printers of both the Enterprise and the Record went on strike for a day to secure a wage increase. During the strike, members of the editorial teams printed a combined "skeleton edition" to explain the situation to subscribers. The Enterprise and the Record consolidated ownership in Nov. 13, 1947 when Record owners, Stanley and Samuel Beaubaire, sold their paper to the Chico Enterprise due to rising operational costs. Both newspapers' offices and printing presses were moved to 700 Broadway. Enterprise Publishing Co. published separate editions of the Evening Enterprise and the Morning Record until Dec. 6, 1948 when they were merged into the Chico Enterprise-Record. After merging, the paper was published in the afternoons Monday through Friday and on Saturday mornings. Bramwell died in 1977 and was then succeeded as publisher and general manager by Garey Weibel, so of former publisher Al Weibel.

On March 14, 1983, the Enterprise-Record was acquired by Donrey Media Group. At the time the paper had a circulation of 26,000. One change the new owners made was the introduction of a Sunday morning edition on Oct. 30, 1983. This made E-R the only paper from Sacramento to southern Oregon publishing seven days a week. A few years later the Enterprise-Record moved its offices and printing presses on Aug. 22, 1987, to 400 E. Park Avenue and has resided there ever since. In 1990, Bramwell was posthumously inducted into the California Newspaper Hall of Fame.

On Sept. 8, 1992, the E-R shifted to an entirely morning newspaper. On Jan. 13, 1999, Donrey merged 10 of its California newspapers, including the Enterprise-Record, into Garden State Newspapers, which was owned by MediaNews Group. Donrey owned a third of the joint venture while MediaNews owned the majority stake. In January 2002, Donrey was renamed to Stephens Media. In June 2015, MediaNews acquired full control of the partnership. In 2021, former Record owner Charles Hastings Deuel was posthumously inducted into the California Newspaper Hall of Fame.

== National influence and coverage ==
In November 2018, the editor of the Enterprise-Record took a photo of Camp Fire, then consuming Paradise, California. The iconic photograph, taken with an iPhone camera, appeared on the websites of the New York Times, Washington Post, and Time magazine. The Los Angeles Times would later run an article detailing the efforts taken by the little paper to cover the tragedy, recognizing the staff for performing at "the highest of levels."
