= Oroville Mercury-Register =

Daily newspaper in Oroville, California, USA

- Type: Daily newspaper
- Owner: Digital First Media
- Founder: L. D. Clark
- Founded: 1873
- Language: English
- City: Oroville, California
- Sister newspapers: Chico Enterprise-Record
- ISSN: 1097-1718
- OCLC number: 27480706
- Website: orovillemr.com

The Oroville Mercury-Register is a daily newspaper in the town of Oroville, California. It is owned by Digital First Media, formerly MediaNews Group. MediaNews Group took control of the paper from Donrey in 1999. It publishes Tuesday through Sunday with a circulation of 5,852. The Mercury-Register has been an edition of the Chico Enterprise-Record since 1996, with a combined circulation of 31,488 as of March 2007.

== History ==
In 1873, L. D. Clark, formerly connected with the Red Bluff Independent, published the first edition of the Oroville Mercury. A year later Clark sold the paper to John C. Gray. He was soon joined by William DeMott. DeMott bought out his business partner in May 1878. Two years later Demott died. His widow sold the paper in January 1884 to Jesse Wood, a former school superintendent and editor of the Chico Enterprise. By June, the paper was published by E. B. Price.

In October 1895, former proprietor Mrs. Frances Price Lawrence resumed control of the paper from Mr. and Mrs. Downer. One paper wrote she "can wield a pen with the cleverest of them" and "There are few women who could have taken a newspaper as this women did and controlled it so sagaciously." That July, Lawrence returned the paper to Hart A. Downer.

In 1912, Edward A. Cunningham Jr., business manager of the Marysville Appeal, purchased the Mercury from J.A. Lawrence. A year later he sold it. The new owner was J. H. Dungan, a former Woodland newsman. He operated the paper until his death in 1922. The Mercury was then passed on to his widow, Mrs. Edythe Van Anda Dungan. In May 1926, she sold the paper to Farewell Brown. The former publisher then enrolled as a student at the College of the Pacific in Stockton. In June 1927, Brown and his mother died from an accidental gas leak. In September 1927, Eugene MacLean, owner of the Mercury, purchased the Oroville Register and consolidated it with his paper.

Dan L. Beebe Sr. was then hired to work as publisher of the newly formed Oroville Mercury-Register. Beebe Sr. previously worked as a manager at the United Press's western division in San Francisco and for a time was a part owner of the Modesto News. He eventually assumed ownership of the Mercury-Register from MacLean in return for operating the paper. The Beebe family owned and managed the paper for over five decades.

Beebe Sr. was local advocate, leading the fight for fluoridated water and the Oroville-Wyandotte Irrigation District's South Fork Project. He would also serve as president of the California Newspaper Publishers Association. In 1973, Beebe Sr. died, and was succeeded as publisher by his son Dan Beebe Jr. In 1981, Beebe Sr. was posthumously inducted into the California Press Association Hall of Fame. In 1983, Beebe Jr. retired and sold the paper to the Buckner News Alliance.

In 1990, the company sold the Mercury-Register to Donrey Media Group. At the time the paper had a circulation of 9,000. Donrey owned two other dailies in the state: the Chico Enterprise-Record and the Red Bluff Daily News. In 1999, Donrey merged 10 of its California newspapers, including the Mercury-Register, into Garden State Newspapers, which was owned by MediaNews Group. Donrey owned a third of the joint venture while MediaNews owned the majority stake.
