= Marin Independent Journal =

Newspaper in Novato, California

- Type: Daily newspaper
- Format: Broadsheet
- Owner(s): MediaNews Group, et al.
- Founder: Jerome A. Barney
- Publisher: Rob Devincenzi
- Managing editor: Jennifer Upshaw Swartz
- Founded: March 23, 1861
- Language: English
- Headquarters: 4000 Civic Center Dr #301; San Rafael, California
- Circulation: 8,734 Daily; 12,001 Sunday (as of 2022)
- Sister newspapers: San Jose Mercury News, Santa Cruz Sentinel, East Bay Times
- ISSN: 0891-5164
- OCLC number: 61313188
- Website: marinij.com

The Marin Independent Journal is a newspaper in Marin County, California. It is owned by California Newspapers Partnership, which is majority owned by MediaNews Group.

== History ==
=== Marin Journal ===
On March 23, 1861, Jerome A. Barney published the first edition of the Marin County Journal in San Rafael, California. It would go on to be one of the state's oldest newspapers. In October 1872, Barney sold the paper to Simon F. Barstow, who grew the business as the area's dairy industry boomed and nearby railroad construction started. The paper also became Republican affiliated. In January 1898, Wallace C. Brown, former owner of the Contra Costa Gazette in Martinez, bought the Journal from Barstow. He sold out after eight months to brothers Stephen and Cassius Clay Olmstead from San Diego. They bought new presses and a Linotype machine. In January 1921, C.C. Olmstead sold the paper to E.L. Kynoch.

Franc C. Farrar briefly owner the Journal until selling it in September 1929 to Harry Johnston and James P. McCabe. In April 1934, H.W. MacKenzie and E.L. Kynoch bought the Journal from McCabe and Johnston, while W.F. McCamish retained his interests. On Jan. 1, 1944, Thomas Frederick Bagshaw acquired the Journal from MacKenzie and the estate of Kynoch. In November 1947, Bagshaw sold the Journal to Henry W. Jackson, who owned the Marin Herald and West Marion Star. On May 2, 1948, Jackson merged the Journal and Herald together expanded the paper from a biweekly to a morning daily.

=== San Rafael Independent ===
In October 1899, Harry H. Granice, owner of the Sonoma Index-Tribune, announced he would start a new weekly called the San Rafael Independent. Its first editor was Thomas C. Howell. The paper became a daily by 1903 under the management of his daughter, Celeste Granice Murphy. That same year The Independent was sold to Michael F. Cochrane, a 27-year-old insurance man. He enlarged the paper and made it Democratic affiliated. He also went on to be named San Rafel postmaster by President Woodrow Wilson and became a member of the State Harbor Commission.

Cochrane died in September 1926. Harry F. Lutgens then bought the paper for $70,000 from his estate. At the time, he was executive secretary to Governor Friend Richardson. Lutgens made The Independent into the county's first daily in 1927. He owned the paper for about 11 years and grew circulation to 10,000. In 1937, he sold it to Roy A. Brown, who previously published the Sanger Herald for 15 years. Justus F. Craemer and William "Bill" O. Hart joined Brown in the purchase. Hart died in a commercial plane crash in 1942. Craemer and Brown then took over Hart's interests.

=== Independent Journal ===
In November 1948, Henry W. Jackson merged the Marin Journal with the San Rafael Independent, which was owned by Roy A. Brown. The new paper would later be called the Independent Journal. In May 1966, Craemer died, and in 1971 he was posthumously inducted into the California Newspaper Hall of Fame. In December 1979, the Brown family sold the paper to Gannett. The Independent Journal then relocated its printing plant from San Rafael to Novato. In 1998, Lutgens was also inducted into the state newspaper hall of fame. In 2000, Gannett sold the paper to MediaNews Group, a partnership headed by William Dean Singleton. At the time the paper's circulation was 40,000. In 2011, former publisher Jack Craemer was also inducted into the state newspaper hall of fame.

==== The "hot-tubber" incident ====
In 2002, former President George H. W. Bush described "American Taliban" John Walker Lindh as "some misguided Marin County hot-tubber." His comment prompted criticism among readers of the Marin Independent Journal, until Bush sent the paper a letter of apology: "Call off the dogs, please. I surrender...I apologize. I am chastened and will never use 'hot tub' and 'Marin county' in the same sentence again."
