= J. Keith Moyer =

American journalist

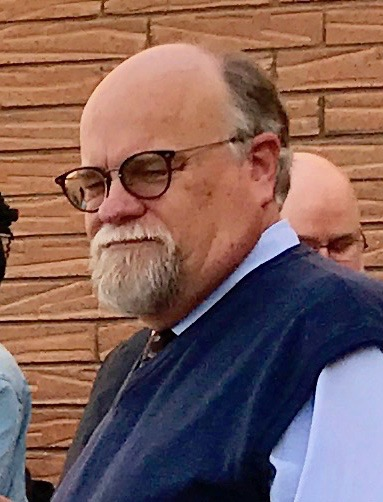
- Born: Joseph Keith Moyer; September 23, 1952 (age 73); Louisville, Kentucky, U.S.
- Education: Satellite High School; Santa Fe College; University of Florida
- Occupation: Editor/Publisher
- Employer(s): The News-Press (1986–1990); Arkansas Gazette (1990–1991); Democrat and Chronicle (1991–1994); The Fresno Bee (1994–2001); Star Tribune (2001–2007); University of Minnesota School of Journalism and Mass Communication (2010–2016); Las Vegas Review-Journal (2016–present)
- Spouse: Marilyn
- Children: 3

Joseph Keith Moyer (born September 23, 1952) is an American publisher and editor of the Las Vegas Review-Journal. Moyer joined the Review-Journal on February 5, 2016, as editor-in-chief, leaving his faculty position of six years at the University of Minnesota School of Journalism and Mass Communication. He became publisher on March 26, 2018.

Moyer was president and publisher of the Star Tribune in Minneapolis, Minnesota from 2001 to 2007. He had earlier been publisher and president for The Fresno Bee from 1997 until 2001.

Moyer joined McClatchy in 1994 as The Fresno Bee's executive editor.

Moyer also held top newsroom roles at Gannett's The News-Press in Fort Myers, Florida, Democrat and Chronicle in Rochester, New York, Westchester-Rockland Newspapers in White Plains, New York and Arkansas Gazette in Little Rock, Arkansas.

In Fort Myers, Moyer served as editor of The News-Press from 1986 until 1990; during that time, he oversaw coverage of poor social conditions faced by African Americans in Southwest Florida that won the 1990 Grand Prize in the Robert F. Kennedy Journalism Awards for "Far from the Dream," a 12-part series of stories.

He is a 1977 graduate and Alumni of Distinction from the College of Journalism and Mass Communication at the University of Florida.
