= Democratic Underground =

Online political community

- Headquarters: United States
- Website: www.democraticunderground.com
- Launched: January 20, 2001; 25 years ago

Democratic Underground is an online community for members of the Democratic Party in the United States. Its membership is restricted by policy to those who are supportive of the Democratic Party and Democratic candidates for political office.

== History ==
Created on December 5, 2000, Democratic Underground was launched on January 20, 2001, the day George W. Bush was inaugurated as United States president. It describes itself as a "grassroots left-of-center political community" and "an online community for friendly, politically liberal people who understand the importance of working together to elect more Democrats and fewer Republicans to all levels of American government".

As of June 2008, over 122,000 user accounts were registered and over 38 million messages had been posted. Democratic Underground publishes articles several days a week and hosts an online store, a directory of links, and forums where members may post on various topics of interest. Discussions from posters at Democratic Underground attracted national attention. One example of this was the dialog about the 2004 Indian Ocean earthquake and tsunami, in which a few posts explored the possibility of "earthquake weapons". The posts were reported by John Schwartz on The New York Times and Brit Hume on Fox News. An administrator also sent a letter to The New York Times, which was printed.

Earlier in 2003, the site attracted the attention of James Taranto in The Wall Street Journal when a poster explained why they wished to see continued bloodshed in Iraq. The forum was mentioned by Chuck Raasch of USA Today within the context of conspiracy theories about the August 2006 transatlantic aircraft plot to blow up airliners between the United Kingdom and the United States. One poster suggested that one reason for why the liquids were banned on airplanes was to allow the airlines to significantly charge more money for their own beverages and that the American government's push to release the announcement of the plot was done to bump Joe Lieberman's primary loss out of the news cycle. On Election Day 2016, the forum was hacked and rendered unavailable, which the site blamed on pro-Trump trolls.

== Copyright infringement lawsuit ==
In 2010, Democratic Underground was sued for alleged copyright infringement in a member's posting of a few paragraphs from an article in the Las Vegas Review-Journal. The suit was brought by Righthaven, an entity that finds Las Vegas Review-Journal quotations online, buys the copyright for that story from the newspaper, and retroactively sues for copyright infringement. In response to the lawsuit, Democratic Underground asserted that the quoted excerpt (five sentences of a 54-sentence article) was fair use, and counterclaimed against Righthaven for fraud, barratry, and champerty. Democratic Underground was represented in the case pro bono by the Electronic Frontier Foundation, attorneys from the firm of Winston & Strawn, and Las Vegas attorney Chad Bowers. After Righthaven lost a similar suit against Realty One Group over 8 of 30 sentences quoted from a news article, Righthaven asked the judge in the case against Democratic Underground to dismiss Righthaven's claim against Democratic Underground. On June 14, 2011, Judge Roger L. Hunt ruled that Righthaven be dismissed from the case because Righthaven had never owned the copyright of the article and gave Righthaven two weeks to explain in writing why it should not be sanctioned.
