= Righthaven =

American copyright enforcement company

- Founded: 2010
- Headquarters: Las Vegas, Nevada

Righthaven LLC was a copyright enforcement company founded in early 2010. Based in Las Vegas, Nevada, it entered into agreements with partner newspapers after finding that their content had been copied to online sites without permission, and pursued litigation against the site owners for copyright infringement. Commentators hevily criticized the lawsuits, describing the activity as copyright trolling and the company as a "lawsuit factory". Righthaven LLC's CEO, Steven Gibson, who is currently a partner at Las Vegas law firm Gibson & True LLP, regularly spoke to the media about Righthaven.

Although its strategy was successful at first, it was undone in 2011 when several judges held that, since Righthaven didn't actually own the copyrights, it had no standing to sue for infringement. The company was forced into receivership in November 2011 because it owed outstanding legal fees to a successful defendant. In January 2012, its domain name, righthaven.com, was sold at auction to help satisfy its debts. In March 2013, Stephens Media bought back the copyrights they had transferred to Righthaven, allowing the Righthaven Receivership Estate to pay off legal fees.

== Lawsuits ==
Righthaven initially entered agreements concerning old news articles from Stephens Media, publisher of the Las Vegas Review-Journal, based on a business model of suing bloggers, other Internet authors, and Internet site operators for statutory damages for having reproduced the articles on their sites without permission. An affiliate of Stephens Media owned half of Righthaven. By March 24, 2011, 255 cases had been filed. Typically, Righthaven has demanded $75,000 and surrender of the domain name from each alleged infringer, but accepted out of court settlements of several thousand dollars per defendant. As of December 2010 approximately 70 cases had settled.

The Electronic Frontier Foundation (EFF) soon took up the case on behalf of several defendants. Kurt Opsahl, an EFF attorney, said, "Despite what Righthaven claims, it's hard to interpret these lawsuits as anything else besides a way to bully Internet users into paying unnecessary settlements."

In August 2010, the company entered an agreement with WEHCO Media in Arkansas to pursue similar actions. Later, it made a similar arrangement with Media News Group, publisher of the San Jose Mercury News.

In December 2010, Righthaven began to sue website operators over republished graphics and photographs, and also expanded its scope to material originally published by the Denver Post and other newspapers. That month it filed more than a dozen lawsuits over a graphic illustration of the "Vdara death ray" that had gone viral.

In April 2011, a federal judge unsealed the agreement between Righthaven and Stephens Media, revealing that Stephens Media receives 50% of the proceeds of lawsuits (after deducting costs). In addition, an attorney for one of the defendants claims that the agreement provides only limited rights to the copyrights of Stephens Media, specifically, only the right to sue. Some defense attorneys argue that one must have complete ownership in order to have standing to sue, which may undermine the lawsuits related to the Review-Journal material.

On June 14, 2011, Federal District Court Judge Roger L. Hunt ruled that Righthaven had no standing to sue for copyright infringement, on the grounds that the original parties retain the actual copyrights. Hunt also dressed down Righthaven for misrepresenting its financial connections to Stephens Media. Among other sanctions imposed by Hunt, Righthaven was fined US$5,000 for the misrepresentation.

On August 15, 2011, after losing a case handled by Marc Randazza Righthaven was ordered to pay $34,045.50 in attorney's fees and court costs in its unsuccessful lawsuit against Wayne Hoehn. Righthaven had sued Hoehn for copying a Review-Journal editorial to a blog. Federal judge Philip Pro found that Righthaven had no standing to sue, and in any case Hoehn's posting was protected by fair use. The matter was then brought to an appeal at the 9th Circuit court of appeals in California, which upheld the dismissal and the attorneys fees judgment.

=== Insolvency ===
On September 7, 2011, Legal Wings Inc., a process server used by Righthaven between May and October 2010, filed a lawsuit against Righthaven in Las Vegas Township Justice Court for unpaid bills valued at $5,670.

On September 8, 2011, the MediaNews Group announced it was terminating its deal with Righthaven at the end of the month. The new CEO of the company, John Paton, called the Righthaven deal "a dumb idea from the start" and further said that had he been CEO at the time of the decision, he would have never signed it.

On October 26, 2011, Righthaven was ordered to pay $119,488 in attorney's fees and court costs in its lawsuit against former federal prosecutor Thomas DiBiase. Righthaven had sued DiBiase for posting a Review-Journal story about a murder case without permission. Hunt, who had also presided over the Democratic Underground case, threw out Righthaven's suit that summer after finding Righthaven lacked standing.

On October 29, 2011, Wayne Hoehn asked Pro to seize Righthaven's assets, including its bank accounts and property, to provide for the payment of Hoehn's legal fees from the August 2011 ruling. The company had previously delayed the payment to avoid bankruptcy.

On November 1, 2011, Pro authorized the US Marshals Service to use reasonable force to seize $63,000 in cash and assets from Righthaven in order to pay Hoehn's legal fees. The amount included additional costs and fees from three months of delays. When it was discovered that the company bank account held less than $1,000, the court issued an order for Righthaven to turn over its intellectual property to a court-appointed receiver to be sold at auction. Righthaven did not comply by the December 19, 2011 deadline, and filed an emergency appeal with the 9th U.S. Circuit Court of Appeals in San Francisco to stop the auction from going forward, a motion which was rejected on January 10, 2012.

On December 21, 2011, the righthaven.com domain name was transferred to the receiver for auction. On January 6, 2012, the righthaven.com domain name sold for $3,300 to a Switzerland-based hosting service with the stated goal of protecting clients against "frivolous or overly aggressive take-down tactics".

On March 13, 2013, what copyrights Righthaven held regarding Stephens Media assets were sold off in order to satisfy financial obligations. Proceeds from the sale were divided between the receivers of the Righthaven Receivership Estate, the litigant Wayne Hoehn, and Hoehn's lawyer, Marc Randazza. As stated by the receiver, "...Righthaven’s rights acquired from Stephens Media were sold back to their original source in a commercially reasonable manner, as no other market existed for them."

== Commentary ==
The cases were covered by many newspapers and blogs. The Las Vegas Review-Journal and its main competitor, the Las Vegas Sun, published a series of editorials criticizing each other over the incident. Wired magazine and others described the lawsuits as copyright trolling and likened the activity to that of patent trolls. Most critics (and several federal judges) agreed that Righthaven had been suing over usage of news items allowed under the "fair use" doctrine.

== See also ==
- Righthaven LLC v. Democratic Underground LLC
- Digital Millennium Copyright Act
- Online Copyright Infringement Liability Limitation Act
