= Las Vegas Review-Journal =

Newspaper published in Las Vegas, Nevada

- June 19, 2006 front page of Las Vegas Review-Journal
- Type: Daily newspaper
- Format: Broadsheet
- Owner: News + Media Capital Group LLC
- Founder: Charles C. Corkhill
- Publisher: J. Keith Moyer
- Editor: Glenn Cook
- Founded: September 18, 1909; 117 years ago (as the Clark County Review)
- Language: English
- Headquarters: 1111 West Bonanza Road; Las Vegas, Nevada; 89106
- Circulation: 24,700 Average print circulation 23,253 Digital Subscribers
- ISSN: 1097-1645
- Website: www.reviewjournal.com

The Las Vegas Review-Journal is a daily subscription newspaper published in Las Vegas, Nevada, since 1909. It is the largest circulating daily newspaper in Nevada and one of two daily newspapers in the Las Vegas area. The Review-Journal has been owned by Sheldon Adelson's News + Media Capital Group LLC since 2015. The paper had a joint operating agreement with The Greenspun Corporation-owned Las Vegas Sun, which was intended to run through 2040 but was cancelled by the Review-Journal in 2026.

== History ==
The Clark County Review was first printed in September 1909. It was founded by Charles C. Corkhill, the first sheriff of Clark County. In August 1914, Corkhill was appointed postmaster. In March 1922, Corkhill sold the Review to T. S. Trebell, who had edited the paper for the last seven months. At that time the paper was renamed to the Las Vegas Review. Several months later Trebell severed his connections to the paper and fled to California where he was arrested by the FBI for his involvement with the IWW. W. F. Rector then took charge.

In October 1922, John H. Lightfoot bought an interest and became editor. He retired in March 1923. A month later Corkhill resumed management. He soon died and his widow May M. Corkhill published the Review. In May 1926, Mrs. Corkhill sold the paper to Frank F. Garside, owner of the Tonopah Daily Times and Gilbert Record. Al Cahlan joined him as partner and worked as managing editor. A year later Cahlan injured his hand in a printing press.

In March 1929, James G. Scrugham, former Nevada governor and former publisher of the Nevada State Journal of Reno, established the Las Vegas Journal. That July, the Review bought the Journal and shortly thereafter began co-publication as the Las Vegas Evening Review-Journal. In the early 1940s, Cahlan and Garside's company, Southwestern Publishing, bought the Las Vegas Age, from Charles P. "Pop" Squires, which began publication in 1905 and was the oldest surviving paper in Las Vegas.

In April 1949, Donald W. Reynolds bought the paper for $500,000 from publisher Garside and managing editor Cahlan. Garside left the company while Cahlan remained. The word "evening" was dropped from the name. In December 1960, Reynolds exercised a buyout option with Cahlan, and bought his remaining stock. He then resigned. In 1971, a new headquarters was built. In June 1990, the Review-Journal entered into a Joint Operating Agreement with the financially struggling Las Vegas Sun, thus combining business and production operations to save money while maintaining separate newsrooms. In April 1993, Reynolds died. His company, Donrey Media Group, was then purchased longtime friend Jack Stephens, chairman of Stephens Group Inc.

In 2000, a new $40 million printing press was installed at the paper's headquarters as part of a four-year, 152,000-square-foot expansion project. The two printing presses weigh 910 tons and consist of 16 towers. They were the largest presses in the world when they were installed. In 2005, the JOA was amended and from then on the Sun ceased afternoon publication and began distribution as a section of the Review-Journal. In March 2015, the Stephens Media newspapers were sold to New Media Investment Group. In December 2015, casino magnate Sheldon Adelson purchased the newspaper for $140 million via News + Media Capital Group LLC. GateHouse Media, a subsidiary of New Media Investment Group, was retained to manage the newspaper. $140 million was considered a steep price amounting to a 69% gain for New Media Investment Group after owning the newspaper for nine months.

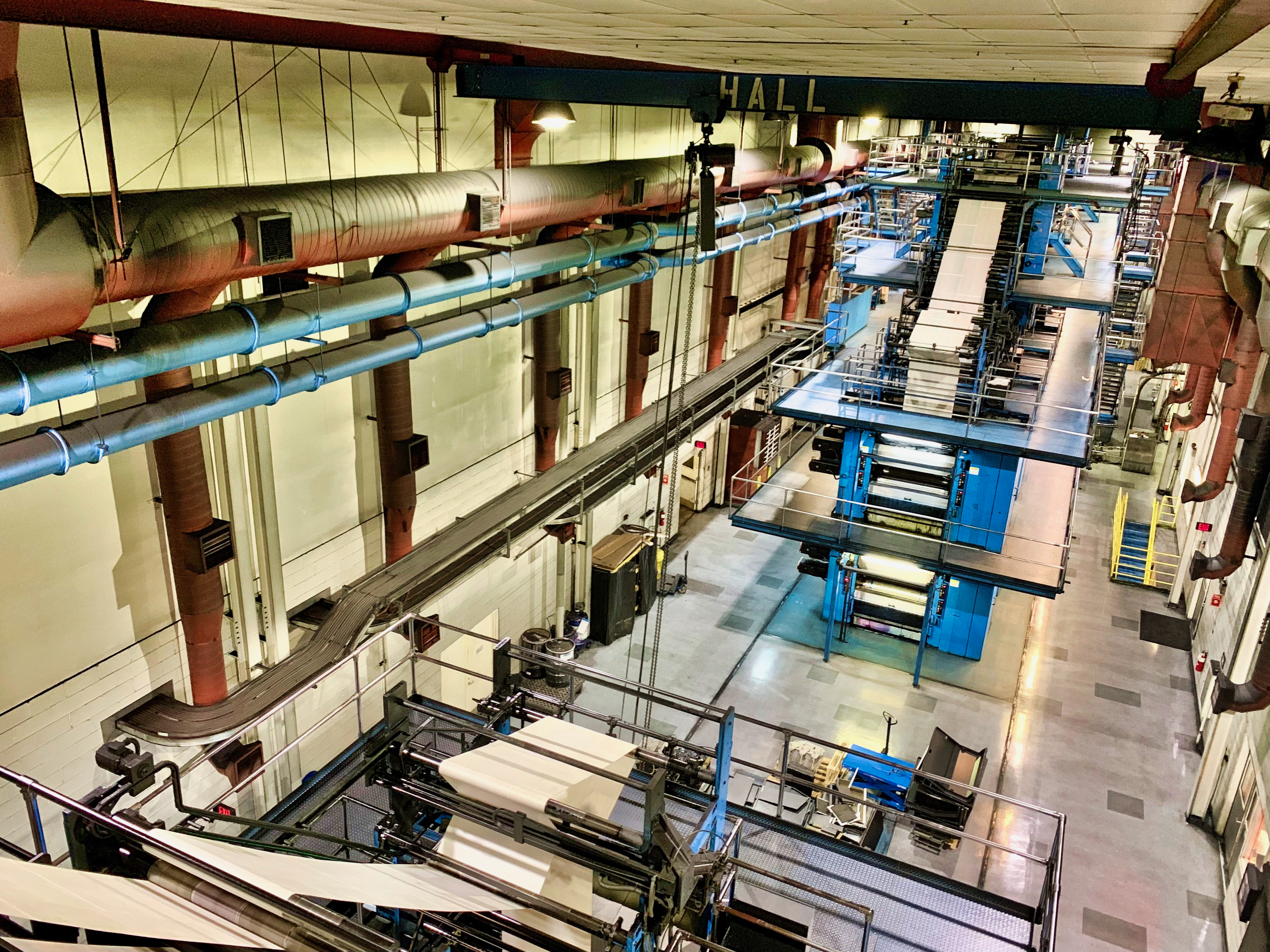
The 910 ton printing presses at the Las Vegas Review-Journal were the largest in the world when installed in 2000

=== Sheldon Adelson estate ownership ===
When the paper was sold in 2015, it was initially unclear who the buyer was. The purchaser was a limited liability company, News + Media Capital Group LLC, and the only name listed on the documents was Michael Schroeder, a publisher of four small regional newspapers in Connecticut. At a December 10 staff meeting informing the Review-Journal staff that the paper had been sold, Schroeder was introduced as the manager. He refused to say who the owners of News + Media were, saying that employees should "focus on [their] jobs...and don't worry about who [the owners] are." Jason Taylor, the Review-Journals' publisher, said only that the ownership included "multiple owner/investors, that some are from Las Vegas, and that in face-to-face meetings he has been assured that the group will not meddle in the newspaper’s editorial content." There were widespread rumors that the primary buyer was Sheldon Adelson, and a week later three Review-Journal reporters confirmed that the purchase had been orchestrated by Adelson's son-in-law Patrick Dumont on Adelson's behalf. A month before the new owner was revealed, three reporters at the newspaper received an assignment from corporate management: Spend two weeks monitoring the activity of three Clark County judges. One of the judges was District Judge Elizabeth Gonzalez, who was hearing a long-running wrongful termination lawsuit filed against Adelson and his company, a lawsuit alleging that Adelson's Macao casino, Sands Macao, was connected to the Chinese Triads.

In January, a set of editorial principles were drawn up and publicized to ensure the newspaper's independence and to deal with possible conflicts of interest involving Adelson's ownership. In February, Craig Moon, a veteran of the Gannett organization, was announced as the new publisher and promptly withdrew those principles from publication. He also began to personally review, edit, and sometimes kill stories about an Adelson-promoted proposal for the future Las Vegas Raiders football stadium. In the months since, reporters say that stories about Adelson, and particularly about an ongoing lawsuit involving his business dealings in Macau, have been heavily edited by top management.

The new ownership triggered numerous departures. On December 23, the paper's editor Mike Hengel stepped down in a "voluntary buyout". Many reporters and editors left the newspaper citing "curtailed editorial freedom, murky business dealings and unethical managers." Longtime columnist John L. Smith resigned after he was told he could no longer write anything about Adelson, a frequent focus of his reporting up until then. Within six months, all three of the reporters who broke the story of Adelson's ownership had left the paper.

== Website and video ==
Las Vegas Review-Journal launched its website as LVRJ.com on Jan. 15, 1997. By the end of the year, it was recognized as one of the top online papers in the U.S. by the Internet Job Source. The Review-Journal also operated LasVegas.com as a general information site. LVRJ.com was redesigned in 2000 and the site was rebranded as Reviewjournal.com two years later. In 2012, the RJ launched its first apps for iPhone, Android, and iPad. A major online redesign launched in April 2017 with an emphasis on video. The RJ built a studio on its downtown campus to produce high-end live and on-demand videos for news, politics and sports.

Programs include:

- Reporter Roundtable – Interviews and panel discussions with reporters covering major stories
- Vegas Nation – Coverage of Raiders football
- Golden Edge – Coverage of the Las Vegas Golden Knights hockey team
- Covering the Cage – UFC and MMA coverage
- Nevada Politics Today
- Sports Betting Spotlight
- Racial inequality in headlines

In addition to delivering its shows on the Review-Journal website, the Review-Journal launched a Roku app in early 2018.

== Accolades ==
In 2018 and 2022, Editor and Publisher magazine named the Review-Journal as one of 10 newspapers in the United States on the magazine's annual list of "10 Newspapers That Do It Right".

The newspaper has won the "General Excellence" award from the Nevada Press Association several times and has also won the "Freedom of the Press" award for its First Amendment battles from the statewide organization.

== Controversy ==
In 1998, the newspaper killed a story about casino mogul Steve Wynn's sexual harassment of employees. The newspaper reported about the axed story in 2018, after The Wall Street Journal published a story in which dozens of people alleged that they had been victims of sexual misconduct by Wynn.

=== Copyright infringement litigation ===
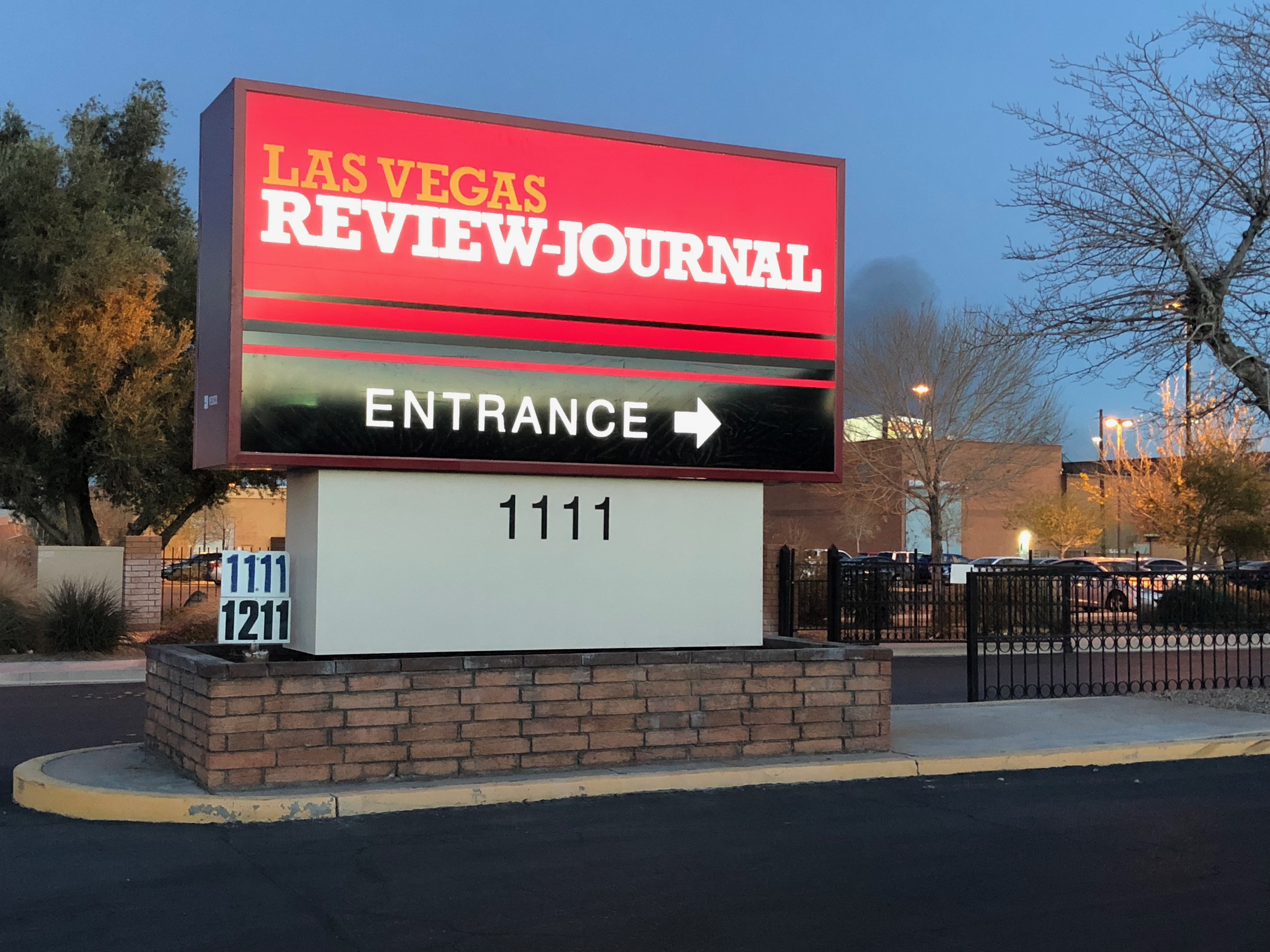
Las Vegas Review-Journal sign

In 2010, the Review-Journal's then-owner Stephens Media launched a copyright enforcement company called Righthaven LLC, which began a series of legal suits claiming copyright infringements. The company's practice was to search the internet for uses of Review-Journal material, purchase the copyright for that material from the newspaper and then file suit for copyright infringement. According to The Wall Street Journal, "Defendants typically get no warning, no take-down request, just a suit." Between March and August 2010, Righthaven LLC filed copyright infringement suits against 107 blogs, political forums, website operators, and others.

The Electronic Frontier Foundation, together with other pro bono attorneys, filed an Answer and Counterclaim on behalf of Democratic Underground, a political website that Righthaven sued after a Democratic Underground member posted a five-sentence excerpt from a Review-Journal article; the counterclaim, filed against Stephens Media and Righthaven asserted that alleged a "sham relationship" between the newspaper and Righthaven, and accused Righthaven of copyright fraud.

In March 2011, a federal judge dismissed a suit brought by Righthaven, stating that no evidence had been presented that the forum posting of a Las Vegas Review-Journal editorial for 40 days for noncommercial use harmed the market value of the work. In June 2011, another federal judge ruled that Righthaven had no standing to sue for copyright infringement, on the grounds that the original parties retain the actual copyrights. In August 2011 another case was dismissed by Federal judge Philip Pro, who found that Righthaven had no standing to sue, and in any case the defendant's posting of a Review-Journal editorial to a blog was protected by fair use. The next month the Review-Journal terminated its arrangement with Righthaven, which was forced into receivership in November 2011 because of unpaid legal settlements.

== Publishers (past and present) ==
1. A. E. Cahlan (1926–1960)
2. Fred W. Smith (1960-1966)
3. William V. Wright (1966-1981)
4. Earl L. Johnson (1981-1988)
5. David A. Osborn (1988-1992)
6. Sherman Frederick (1992-2010)
7. Bob Brown (2010-2014)
8. Ed Moss (2014)
9. Mark Ficarra (2014-2015)
10. Jason Taylor (2015-2016)
11. Craig Moon (2016-2018)
12. J. Keith Moyer (2018–present)

== Current and past contributors ==
- Molly Ball, former lead political reporter
- Norm Clarke, wrote the column "Vegas Confidential" from 1999 to 2016
- Ned Day, columnist whose car was bombed in 1986
- Denver Dickerson, former editorial director who became Speaker of the Nevada Assembly
- Major Garrett, former reporter who became CBS' Chief White House correspondent
- Jeff German, former investigative reporter found fatally stabbed outside his home
- Paul Gutierrez, former reporter who went on to report for ESPN
- John Katsilometes, celebrity and entertainment columnist
- Lorna Kesterson, former reporter and mayor of Henderson, Nevada
- David Lamb, former reporter
- Heidi Knapp Rinella, former restaurant critic
- Robin Leach, former entertainment reporter for the newspaper's niche division
- Gary Martin, former Washington bureau chief
- Michael Ramirez, cartoonist
- Donald W. Reynolds, owner from 1949 to 1993
- Wayne Allyn Root, politics opinion columnist
- Neal Rubin, former features writer
- Debra Saunders, White House correspondent and Washington columnist
- Joe Schoenmann, former reporter
- Ira Stoll, columnist
- Jude Wanniski, former political columnist

== See also ==
- List of newspapers in Nevada
- Media in Las Vegas
