= Redlands Daily Facts =

Daily newspaper in Redlands, California

- Type: Daily newspaper
- Format: Broadsheet
- Owner(s): Southern California News Group (MediaNews Group)
- Founder: Edgar F. Howe
- Publisher: Ron Hasse
- Editor: Frank Pine
- Founded: 1890; 136 years ago
- Language: English
- Headquarters: 19 E. Citrus Avenue, Suite 102, Redlands, California, 92373
- Circulation: 7,470 Daily; 8,254 Sunday (as of September 2014)
- Website: redlandsdailyfacts.com

The Redlands Daily Facts is a paid daily newspaper based in Redlands, California, serving the Redlands area. The Daily Facts is a member of Southern California News Group (formerly the Los Angeles Newspaper Group), a division of Digital First Media. Founded in 1890, the paper was purchased by Donrey Media in 1981. Digital First Media took control of the paper in 1999.

== History ==
The Redlands Daily Facts began as a weekly newspaper on October 23, 1890. It was founded by Edgar F. Howe. The paper immediately faced competition from The Citrograph, an older paper operated by Scipio Craig. The Facts grew and expanded into a daily two years later. A.G. Sheahan bought the paper in April 1893, but Howe remained on as managing editor. J.P. Durbin joined the firm as a foreman in July 1893. He later became a co-publisher with Howe. Howe and Durbin bought the paper from Sheahan in September 1894. Howe sold his stake William G. Moore in August 1895, and Durbin sold out a week later.

Captain William Graff Moore was an American Civil War veteran who fought in 55th Pennsylvania Infantry Regiment until getting shot in the arm. Before his death in 1899, he passed the paper on to his son Paul W. Moore. In 1901, the Facts joined the Associated Press. Paul Moore at one time served as president of the California Newspaper Publishers Association and was active in a number of civic intuitions and community events. He died in 1942. Moore Middle School in Redlands was later dedicated in his honor. After his death, the paper was left in the hands of his sons; Frank E. Moore the editor and William "Bill" G. Moore the publisher.

Four decades later, the Moore brothers sold the paper to the Donrey Media Group in 1981. A year later, the Facts began publishing a 6-day paper, Sunday through Friday, in the mid-1990s. On January 13, 1999, Donrey merged 10 of its California newspapers, including the Daily Facts, into Garden State Newspapers, which was owned by MediaNews Group. Donrey owned a third of the joint venture while MediaNews owned the majority stake. On September 4, 2010, the newspaper returned to a 7-day publication.
