= Los Angeles Daily News =

Daily newspaper in Los Angeles

- Front page, July 19, 2009 edition
- Type: Daily newspaper
- Format: Broadsheet
- Owner(s): Southern California News Group (MediaNews Group)
- Publisher: Ron Hasse
- Editor: Tom Bray
- Founded: 1911; 115 years ago (as the Van Nuys Call)
- Language: English
- Headquarters: 21622 Plummer Street, Suite #200; Chatsworth, California 91311; United States
- Circulation: 56,493 Daily; 79,646 Sunday (as of September 2014)
- Website: dailynews.com
- Free online archives: cdnc.ucr.edu (1930-1963)

The front page of The Van Nuys News published on January 22, 1915.

The Los Angeles Daily News is the second-largest-circulating paid daily newspaper of Los Angeles, California, after the unrelated Los Angeles Times, and the flagship newspaper of the Southern California News Group, a subsidiary of the Colorado-based MediaNews Group.

The offices of the Daily News are in Chatsworth, and much of the paper's reporting is targeted toward readers in the San Fernando Valley in Los Angeles. Its stories tend to focus on issues involving local San Fernando Valley businesses, education, and crime.

== History ==
=== Van Nuys News (1911–1981) ===
The Daily News began publication in Van Nuys as the Van Nuys Call on October 13, 1911. E.R. Elkins founded the weekly newspaper, and sold it after six weeks to Frank M. Keffer, a reporter from Pittsburgh, who renamed it to the Van Nuys News. In 1920, Walter Mendenhall became a co-owner. In 1922, the paper expanded to a twice weekly.

In 1926, Keffer was elected president of the Southern California Editorial Association. In 1927, the News had 799 paying subscribers. In 1932, Keffer sold his stake to William Colfax Markham and his children. In the 1940s, the paper began producing its front page on green colored paper to set itself apart from the competition.

In 1953, the paper was renamed the Van Nuys News and Valley Green Sheet. During this period, the paper was delivered for free to readers in 14 zoned editions in the San Fernando Valley. The News expanded to three days a week in 1954, and four days in 1959. A few years later the paper expanded coverage to the Conejo, Simi and Santa Clarita valleys.

In December 1960, Keffer died. In August 1961, Walter Mendenhall died. In September 1961, Markham died. The paper was inherited by his children and the other owner's son Ferdinand Mendenhall, who in 1970 was elected president of the California Newspaper Publishers Association.

In 1973, the Tribune Company acquired the News from the Markham and Mendenhall families. At that time, the paper had a circulation of 276,000. The sale price was $25 million. In 1976, the green front page was dropped. In 1979, the News expanded to seven days a week.

=== Los Angeles Daily News (1981–present) ===
In 1981, the paper stopped its free distribution and was renamed to the Los Angeles Daily News. Later that year, former owner Ferdinand Mendenhall died. A few years later, federal regulators forced Tribune Co. to sell the Daily News as a condition of its acquisition of KTLA. The winning bid went to Jack Kent Cooke for $176 million. At that time Cooke owned the Washington Redskins and the Chrysler Building.

In 1987, the Daily News relocated to a 132,000-square-foot building. In 1990, a new printing plant was opened in Valencia. When the Los Angeles Herald Examiner went out of business November 2, 1989, it left the Daily News as the second-biggest paper in the city behind the Los Angeles Times. In April 1997, Cooke died. That December, his estate sold the Daily News to MediaNews Group, at that time headed by William Dean Singleton.

The paper was consolidated with other Southern California titles into a subsidiary called the Los Angeles Newspaper Group, which later became the Southern California News Group. All papers in the group are local editions of the Daily News.

== Similarly titled earlier newspapers ==
The Daily News bears no relation to an earlier historic Los Angeles Daily News (1923–1954), a morning newspaper based in Downtown Los Angeles (originally the Illustrated Daily News) that ceased publication on December 18, 1954.

An even earlier newspaper called the Los Angeles Daily News was printed beginning in 1869 and continuing for a number of years after.

== Political endorsements ==
The Daily News endorsed Barack Obama for president in 2008, but then endorsed his opponent Mitt Romney in 2012.
