= The San Bernardino Sun =

Newspaper in San Bernardino, California, United States

San Bernardino Sun
- Type: Daily newspaper
- Format: Broadsheet
- Owner(s): Southern California News Group (MediaNews Group)
- Founder(s): W.A. Selkirk; N.J. Levinson
- Publisher: Ron Hasse
- Editor: Frank Pine
- Senior Editor: Jessica Keating
- Founded: 1894; 132 years ago
- Language: English
- Headquarters: 290 N. D St. Suite 102; San Bernardino, California, 92401
- Circulation: 52,273 Daily; 57,150 Sunday (as of 2010)
- Sister newspapers: Inland Valley Daily Bulletin, Redlands Daily Facts
- Website: sbsun.com
- Free online archives: cdnc.ucr.edu (1894-1998)

The San Bernardino Sun is a paid daily newspaper in San Bernardino County, California, headquartered in the city of San Bernardino. Founded in 1894, it has significant circulation in neighboring Riverside County, and serves most of the Inland Empire in Southern California, with a circulation area spanning from the border of Los Angeles and Orange counties to the west, east to Yucaipa, north to the San Bernardino Mountain range and south to the Riverside County line. It is part of the Southern California News Group family of local newspapers serving specific areas of Southern California. The Sun is owned by Digital First Media which is controlled by Alden Global Capital.

== History ==
At various times, the newspaper was known as The Sun, The Sun-Telegram, The San Bernardino County Sun, and The San Bernardino Daily Sun. On September 1, 1894, the first issue of The Daily Sun was published in San Bernardino, California. W.A. Selkirk was the editor and N.J. Levinson was business manager. Soon Robert C. Harbison was hired as a reporter. In March 1896, Selkirk retired from the paper. A group of business men bought the Sun and installed Edward N. Buck as editor and manager.

Under Buck, the Sun was affiliated with the Silver Republican Party. The other owners quickly grew dissatisfied with Buck and foreclosed on the mortgage. The paper was then sold to Harbison, who became editor, and R.E. Norton, who became business manager. In response, Buck had two men armed with Winchester rifles barricade themselves inside the paper's office while he sought to legally stop the sale. During the night, a group of men rushed the office, broke down the door and threw the guards out into the street. Harbison and Norton then took charge of the Sun in August 1896.

In 1937, Harbison died. He was succeeded as editor and company president by James A. Guthrie. In 1949, the paper dedicated a new $500,000 headquarters. In 1964, Guthrie and the Harbison family sold the paper to Times Mirror, owner of the Los Angeles Times, and Guthrie died in 1966. Times Mirror was court ordered to sell the Sun in 1968 to Gannett due to antitrust concerns. In 1970, Guthrie was posthumously inducted into the California Newspaper Hall of Fame. In 1999, the Sun came under the management of MediaNews Group. At that time the paper had a daily circulation of 80,000.
