= The Advertiser News =

Former newspaper in Tennessee, United States

- Type: Weekly newspaper
- Format: Broadsheet
- Owner(s): GateHouse Media Inc.
- Publisher: Keith Ponder; Gen Manager: Craig Duncan
- Editor: Chris Yow
- Founded: 2003
- Language: English
- Ceased publication: 2020
- Headquarters: 3011 Harrah Dr, Suite J Spring Hill, TN, 37174; United States
- Website: advertisernews.biz

The Advertiser News was a weekly newspaper in Spring Hill, Tennessee. It was founded in 2003 and closed sometime in 2020. It is owned and published by GateHouse Media Inc. at the time of its closing.

== History ==
The Advertiser News was first published in October 2003 by founder Jeff Bryant, his wife Karen Bryant, and sales specialist David Hancock. The business was sold to Las Vegas-based Stephens Media in 2005.

On February 19, 2015, the company sold its newspapers to New Media Investment Group, a publicly traded company based in New York, for $102.5 million in cash. The deal closed in April 2015 and the papers from then on were managed by GateHouse Media.

In April 2020, the paper's managing editor Chris Yow was laid off and his position at Gannet was eliminated.
