= Statutory damages =

Statutory damages are a damage award in civil law, in which the amount awarded is stipulated within the statute rather than being calculated based on the degree of harm to the plaintiff. Lawmakers will provide for statutory damages for acts in which it is difficult to determine a precise value of the loss suffered by the victim. This could be because calculation of a value is impractical, such as in intellectual property cases where the volume of the infringement cannot be ascertained. It could also be because the nature of the injury is subjective, such as in cases of a violation of a person's rights. The award might serve not only as compensation but also for deterrence, and it is more likely to succeed in serving a deterrence function when the potential defendants are relatively sophisticated parties. Other functions that can be served by statutory damages include reducing administrative costs and clarifying the consequences of violating the law.

The amount of statutory damages can be set on a per-incident basis, such as in the Fair Debt Collection Practices Act, which gives statutory damages of up to $1,000 for a violation of its provisions. Amounts could also be set per day, as in acts proscribing human-rights violations which might specify damages of $1,000 per day. The term also applies wherein damages are a multiple of what the legally entitled payment would have been in the matter, which would be typical for copyright or trademark infringement.

The principle of in pari delicto applies, preventing people from suing others for crimes in which they also are equally at fault.

== Intellectual property ==
In intellectual property cases (relating to copyright or trademark, for instance), it is often difficult for plaintiffs to determine the exact volume of infringement. Thus, statutory damages are often calculated as a multiple of the price for the use of the property, if the infringer had requested and paid for permission. Other statutes may set a fixed amount for each day the violation occurred, for each violation, work, article, or type of good.

- In the United States, statutory damages are set at a minimum of $750 per work, to a maximum of $150,000. In Europe, directive 2004/48/EC on the Enforcement of Intellectual Property Rights bases the damages on, "the amount of royalties which would have been due if the infringer has requested authorisation".
- The Lanham (Trademark) Act provides for minimum damages of $1000 and a maximum of $2,000,000 (if willful) for using a counterfeit trademark in commerce (15 U.S.C. § 1117(c), Lanham Act Section 35(c).)
- The Electronic Communications Privacy Act provides for statutory damages for various wiretap offences of $100 per day, up to $10000.

One area of debate between legal and economic scholars that pertains to the quantification of statutory patent damages is whether the court may rely on information that postdates the determined date of the hypothetical negotiation between the patent holder and the alleged infringer. Some commentators argue that the court should rely on postdate information to deter patent infringement and ensure the patent holder's adequate compensation, while others argue that doing so would "give the potential licensee a free option to infringe, which would discourage the potential licensee from promptly entering into a licensing agreement."

== Civil rights ==
California's Unruh Civil Rights Act (Civ. Code, § 51 section 52) provides for minimum damages of $4000 for victims of discrimination under the Americans with Disabilities Act.

== See also ==
- Statutory damages for copyright infringement
