= Vallejo Times Herald =

Daily newspaper in Vallejo, California, USA

Vallejo Times-Herald
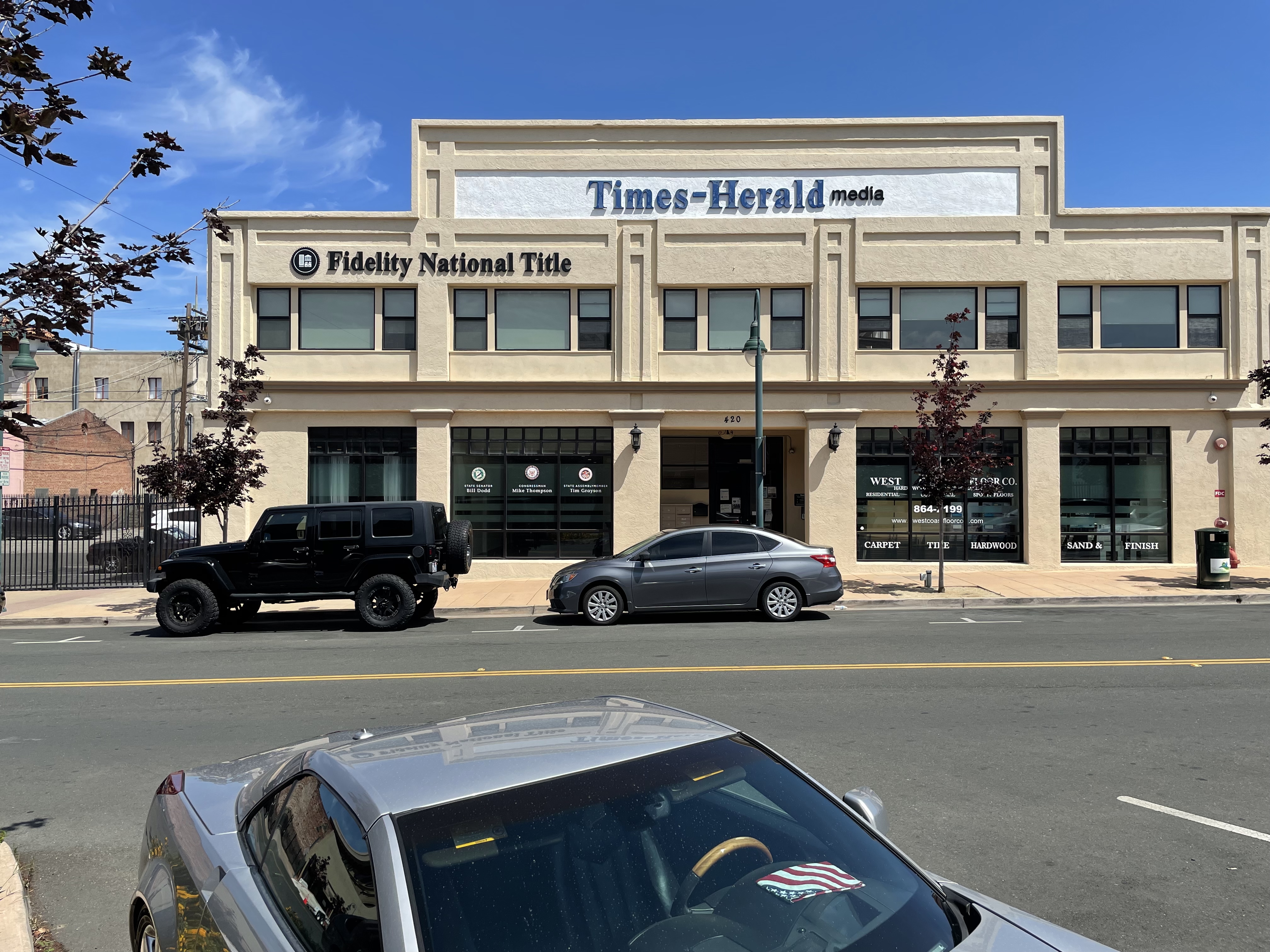
- The newspaper's headquarters in 2022
- Type: Daily newspaper
- Owner: Digital First Media
- Founder(s): T.L. Thompson; J.F. Linthicum
- Editor: Jack Bungart
- Founded: 1872; 154 years ago (as the Vallejo Daily Independent)
- Headquarters: 420 Virginia St., Ste. 2A,
- City: Vallejo, California
- Country: United States
- Circulation: 3,264 Daily; 4,278 Sunday (as of 2022)
- OCLC number: 34107484
- Website: timesheraldonline.com

The Vallejo Times-Herald is a daily newspaper in Vallejo, California. It is printed six days a week, Tuesday through Sunday.

== History ==
The first edition of the Vallejo Daily Independent was published on Jan. 6, 1872. It was founded by T.L. Thompson and J.F. Linthicum. Linthicum sold the paper three years later to A.B. Gibson and George Roe, who then changed the name to the Solano Daily Times on Sept. 23, 1875. The paper later became the Vallejo Times.

In 1916, Luther E. Gibson bought a small commercial printing plant in Santa Cruz and brought on high school student Kenneth F. Knight as his apprentice. A year later Gibson enlisted to in the U.S. military to serve during World War I. Knight finished school and started a monthly magazine called Sanda, which covered the Mare Island Naval Shipyard. He soon expanded it to a weekly newspaper called The Mare Island Employee.

Struggling to find a printer, he contacted Gibson who had just returned from France and was working at the Watsonville Register. The men formed a partnership with two others and each contributed $500 to purchase a defunct printing plant from Antioch and restart it in Vallejo. On Jan. 4, 1922, the first edition of the Vallejo Herald was published by Gibson, Knight, John "Jerry" Motzko and Leonard King. At that time three other daily papers were published in the city.

In April 1922, the Times merged with the Herald. Times publisher Robert W. Walker was the majority stock owner and Gibson was a minority owner and the paper's business manager. Five years later Gibson bought the Vallejo Chronicle and merged it with Vallejo News to form the News-Chronicle, but the paper eventually ceased. Gibson served as a California state senator from 1948 to 1968 and was simply known by some as "the senator." In November 1973, Gibson sold a half-interest in the paper to the Donrey Media Group and continued to work as the paper's publisher.

On June 20, 1978, five unions representing 88 employees working at the Times-Herald went on strike and picketed the office. Thirty employees from other Donrey papers were brought in to put out the Times-Herald. Some of the striking workers established a rival paper called the Vallejo Independent Press, or The V.I.P. Wyman Riley served as publisher, and the paper ceased in 1984.

In July 1988, former owner Gibson died. On Jan. 13, 1999, Donrey merged 10 of its California newspapers, including the Times-Herald, into Garden State Newspapers, which was owned by MediaNews Group. Donrey owned a third of the joint venture while MediaNews owned the majority stake. In September 2000, Gannett joined the venture, called the California Newspaper Partnership. In January 2002, Donrey was renamed to Stephens Media. In June 2015, MediaNews acquired full control of the partnership. That same year, Gibson was posthumously inducted into the California Newspaper Hall of Fame.

== Miscellaneous ==
This newspaper was one of three newspapers to receive a letter from the Zodiac Killer on August 1, 1969.
