= Donald W. Reynolds =

American businessman, philanthropist and media owner

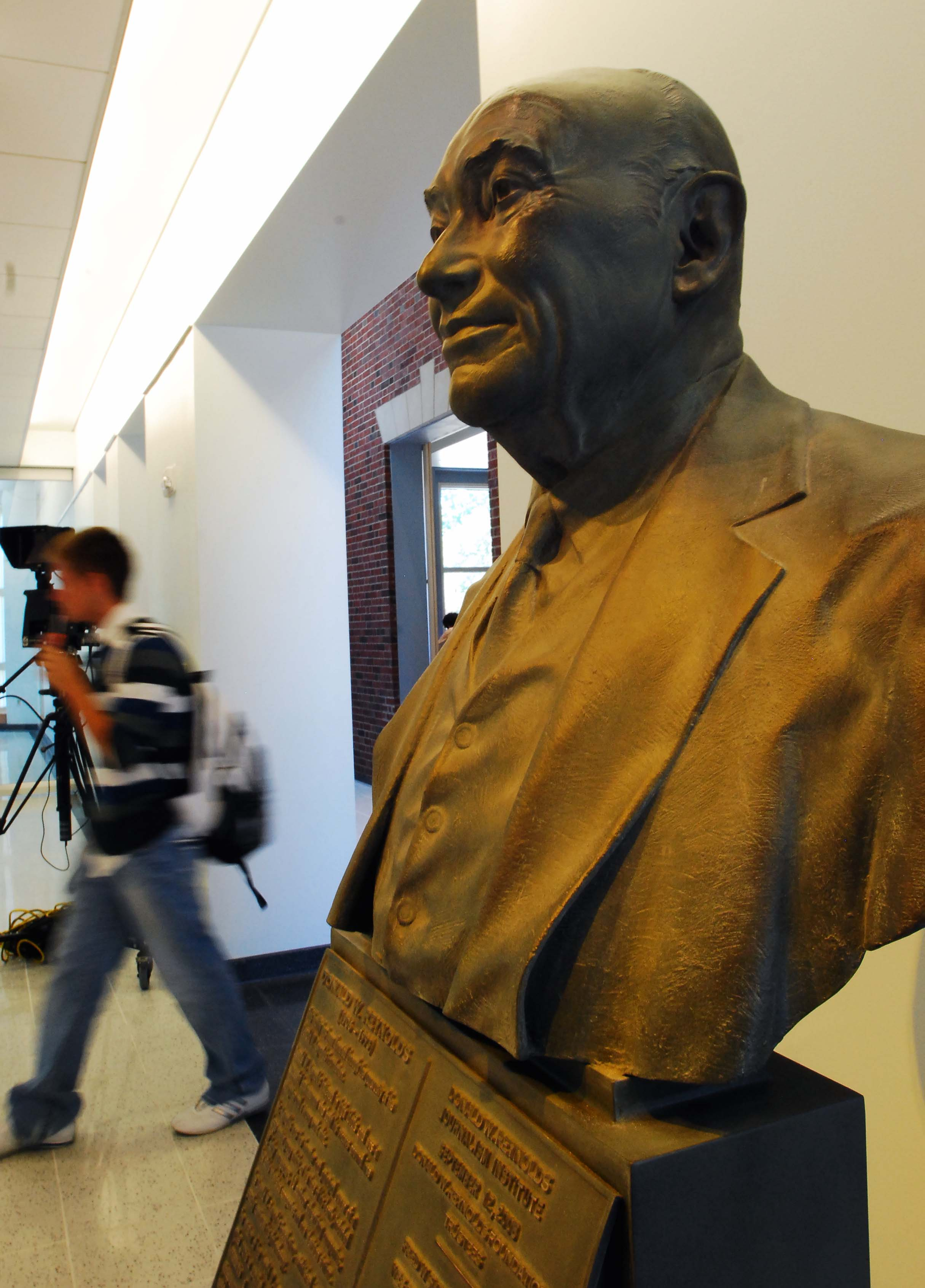
- Born: Donald Worthington Reynolds; September 23, 1906; Fort Worth, Texas, U.S.
- Died: April 2, 1993 (aged 86); Mediterranean Sea
- Education: University of Missouri
- Occupations: Businessman and philanthropist

Donald Worthington Reynolds (September 23, 1906 – April 2, 1993) was an American businessman and philanthropist. He was the founder of Donrey Media Group, a communications company with newspaper, broadcasting and cable television holdings, and outdoor advertising.

== Biography ==
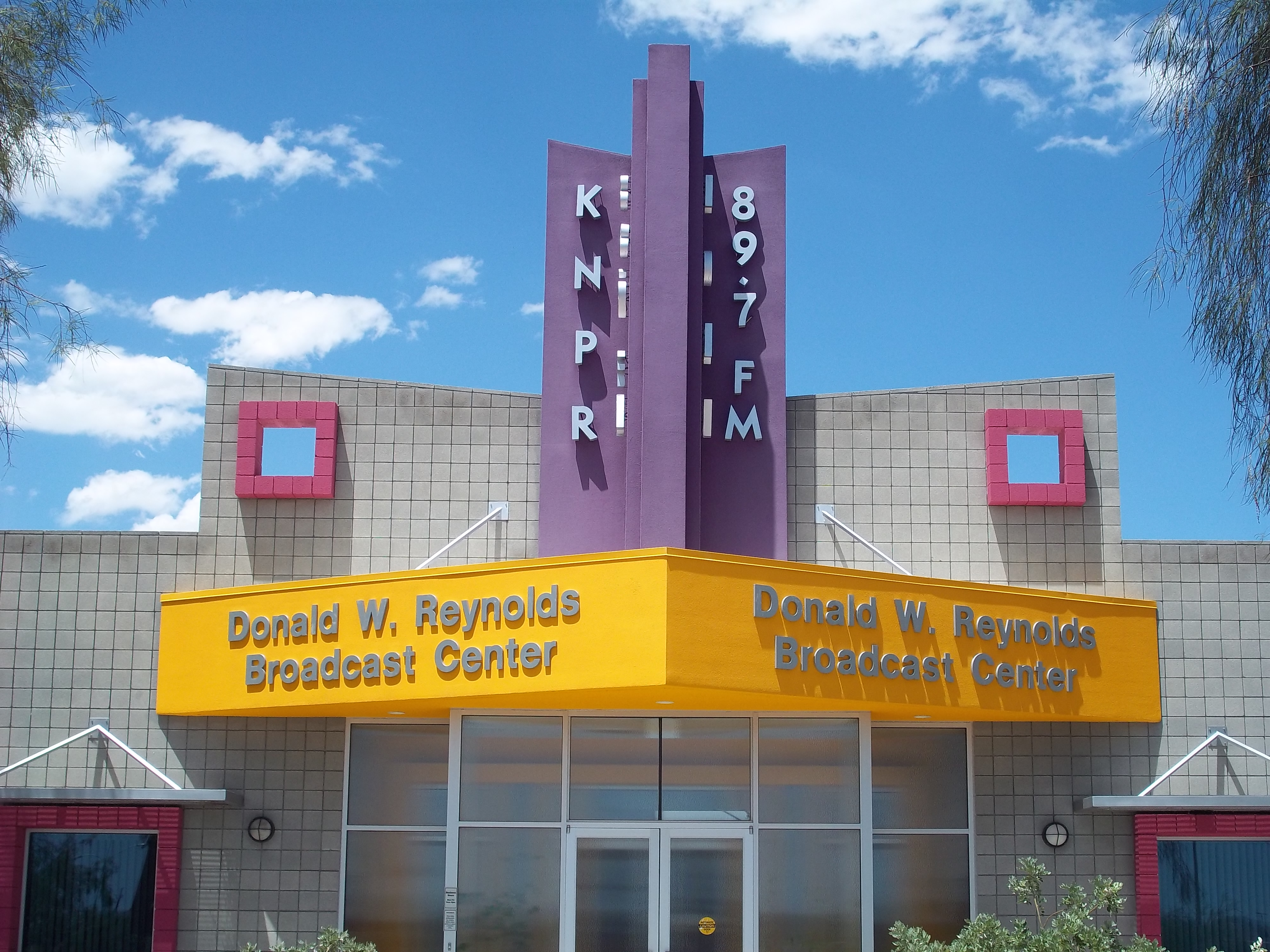

On September 23, 1906, Donald Worthington Reynolds was born in Fort Worth, Texas. His mother was Anna Louise Reynolds and his father was Gaines W. Reynolds, who worked as a grocery salesman and then owned and operated the Marquette hotel. His family moved to Oklahoma City shortly after his birth. At age 12, he worked as a paperboy, buying and selling copies of The Oklahoma Times for half a cent and selling them for a penny.

After he graduated from Central High School, he enrolled in the University of Missouri's School of Journalism, and worked at a meat packing plant to pay for his studies. In college, he was student president and business manager of the Savitar, the university yearbook. He was also a member of Pi Kappa Alpha and an advanced ROTC cadet. In 1927, he graduated and then was fired from his first two jobs working for newspapers in Kansas City and Indianapolis. He was then hired at the Austin American-Statesman where he sold ads, laid out pages and worked on the news desk. Co-owner Charles E. Marsh, impressed by his efforts, offered him part ownership in a small photoengraving plant.

In 1934, he worked for the United Press in Europe and accompanied the Italian Army fighting in Second Italo-Ethiopian War. Upon returning to the U.S. in 1936, Reynolds bought an interest in the Quincy Evening News in Massachusetts from the Marsh-Fentress Newspaper Group, his former employer. He then profited a year later in March 1937 after the News was acquired by the owners of the Quincy Patriot Ledger, who absorbed it into their paper. Reynolds then bought an interest Orange Courier in New Jersey, which went bankrupt in August 1938. He then invested in the Wichita Falls Post in Texas, which in September 1938 ceased due to competition. In March 1940, Reynolds bought the Fort Smith Times Record and Southwest American. Also in March, he purchased the Okmulgee Daily Times. Thus, Donrey Media Group was born.

In February 1943, Reynolds was drafted into military service as the rank "Second Lieutenant" due to his time in ROTC. He was sent to Australia and then Europe. He worked as the officer as the officer in charge of the Pacific and London editions of Yank, the Army Weekly. During a bombing raid off the Normandy coast, his reconnaissance plane was hit by German shell, and fragments of hot metal wounded him in the face, neck and shoulders. He was thus awarded a Purple Heart. In February 1945, he was honorably discharged as a Major in the U.S. military intelligence reserve. He also earned the Legion of Merit and Bronze Star Medal.

After the end of World War II, Reynolds began acquiring small and medium communication companies. In December 1946, he was granted a permit to launch a radio station in Fort Smith called KFSA. In May 1947, he purchased the Bartlesville Morning Examiner and Daily Enterprise.

=== Death ===
In 1990, Reynolds retired. On April 2, 1993, died while aboard cruise ship in the Ligurian Sea bound for Barcelona. At the time of his death, he owned 53 daily newspapers, 11 outdoor advertising companies, five cable television companies and one television station. He was survived by his wife, three children and six grandchildren.

A large sum of money from his business ventures went to the Donald W. Reynolds Foundation.

Reynolds left three children on his death: Nancy, Donald, and Jonathan. Forbes Magazine noted that Reynolds's three children were to receive trust income of $50,000 a year for life, but would be left only $1 if they were to unsuccessfully contest his will. The bulk of the estate was left to The Donald W Reynolds Foundation.

== Broadcasting ==
Donrey Media Group, its subsidiaries and affiliates, owned the following broadcast stations:

- KFSA, Ft. Smith, Arkansas
- KFSA-TV, Ft. Smith, Arkansas
- KBRS, Springdale, Arkansas
- KOCM(FM), Facility ID 33904, Newport Beach, California (April 1981-
- KEXO, Grand Junction, Colorado
- KLDR-FM, Grand Junction, Colorado
- KOLO, Reno, Nevada
- KOLO-TV, Reno, Nevada
- KORK, Las Vegas, Nevada
- KORK-FM, Las Vegas, Nevada
- KORK-TV, Las Vegas, Nevada
- KGNS, Laredo, Texas
- KGNS-TV, Laredo, Texas

== Buildings ==
A number of buildings are named for Reynolds, including:

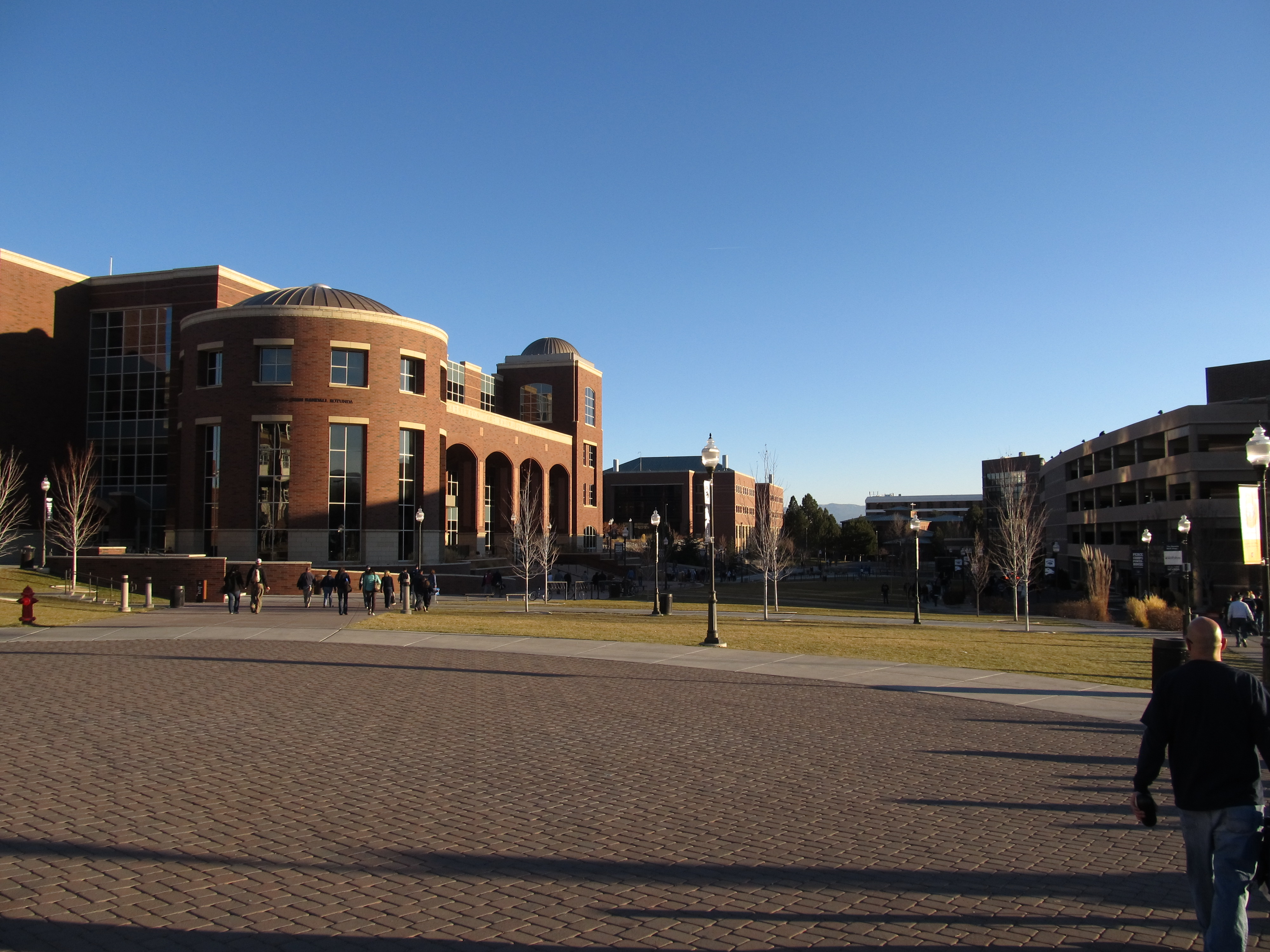

- The Donald W. Reynolds Community Center in Seminole, Oklahoma
- The Donald W. Reynolds Community Center & Water Park in Pauls Valley, Oklahoma
- Donald W. Reynolds Campus and Community Center at Southern Arkansas University
- The Donald W. Reynolds Razorback Stadium
- The Donald W. Reynolds Cancer Support House in Fort Smith, Arkansas
- The Donald W. Reynolds Center for Life Sciences at Hendrix College
- The Donald W. Reynolds Institute on Aging at the University of Arkansas for Medical Sciences in Little Rock, AR
- The Reynolds Center at Harding University
- The Donald W. Reynolds Performing Arts Center at the University of Oklahoma,
- The Donald W. Reynolds Broadcast Center at the College of Southern Nevada,
- The Donald W. Reynolds Performance Hall at the University of Central Arkansas
- The Donald W. Reynolds YMCA in Warren, Arkansas
- The Donald W. Reynolds Alumni Center and the Donald W. Reynolds Journalism Institute at the Missouri School of Journalism
- The Donald W. Reynolds Center for Technology at Western Nevada College in Carson City, NV
- The Donald W. Reynolds School of Journalism at the University of Nevada, Reno
- The Donald W. Reynolds Center at the University of Tulsa
- The Donald W. Reynolds Community Center in Poteau, Oklahoma
- The Donald W. Reynolds Center for Business and Economic Development at the University of Arkansas at Little Rock
- The Donald W. Reynolds Science Center at Henderson State University
- The Donald W. Reynolds School of Architecture at Oklahoma State University
- The Donald W. Reynolds Technology Center at Oklahoma State University Institute of Technology in Okmulgee, OK
- The Donald W. Reynolds Center for American Art and Portraiture in Washington, DC.
- The Donald W. Reynolds Emergency Shelter and Recreation building at the Northwest Arkansas Children's Shelter, and
- The Donald W. Reynolds Museum and Education Center at the Mount Vernon estate of George Washington in Virginia
- The Donald W. Reynolds Library in Mountain Home, Arkansas
- The Donald W. Reynolds Center at Arkansas State University Mid-South in West Memphis, AR
- The Donald W. Reynolds Center for Health Sciences on the Arkansas State University campus in Jonesboro, AR
- The Donald W Reynolds Community Center and Library in Durant, Oklahoma
- The Donald W. Reynolds Cultural Center at Nevada Ballet Theatre in Las Vegas, NV
- The Donald W. Reynolds Scouting Resource Center in Las Vegas, NV
- The Smith Center ( Reynolds Hall ) Performing Arts Center, Las Vegas, NV.
- The Donald W. Reynolds Scout Training Center at Camp Rockefeller in Damascus, AR.

== Foundation ==
The Donald W. Reynolds Foundation continued his lengthy legacy of charitable giving through 2015, funding programs for capital grants, aging and quality of life, cardiovascular clinical research, and journalism. In accordance with its articles of incorporation, the Foundation was designated to terminate rather than continue in perpetuity. Its board of trustees determined that the foundation would cease to make grants by the year 2022. In fact, the foundation liquidated its assets and closed its doors at the end of 2017.

== Awards ==
- 1978, The Oklahoma Journalism Hall of Fame
- 1985, Golden Plate Award of the American Academy of Achievement
- 2000, Arkansas Business Hall of Fame
