= Stephens Media (newspapers) =

American media investment company (1940–2015)

Stephens Media LLC
- Type: Private
- Industry: Newspapers
- Founded: 1940; 86 years ago (as Donrey Media Group)
- Founder: Donald W. Reynolds
- Defunct: February 19, 2015; 11 years ago
- Fate: Acquired
- Successor: GateHouse Media
- Headquarters: Las Vegas, Nevada, U.S.
- Products: Newspapers, magazines, online
- Number of employees: 2,000+

Stephens Media LLC was a Las Vegas, Nevada, United States, diversified media investment company. It owned stakes in the California Newspapers Partnership and the Northwest Arkansas Democrat Gazette.

The company once had an interactive Internet business, operating online sites for its newspapers and portal sites like LasVegas.com, which is licensed to Greenspun Media Group. The company was also a partner in the California Newspapers Partnership with MediaNews and Gannett. The company also formed Northwest Arkansas Newspapers LLC in November 2009, a joint venture with WEHCO Media Inc., in Arkansas.

On November 28, 2010, Stephens Media Iowa, LLC, a subsidiary of Stephens Media, acquired several newspapers, including the Ames Tribune, Boone News-Republican, Dallas County News, Nevada Journal, Ames About People & Advertiser, Tri-County Times, and Algona Upper Des Moines from Midlands Newspapers Inc., a subsidiary of the Omaha World-Herald Company. In August, 2011, the Algona Upper Des Moines was sold to Hallmark Media.

In February 2015, Stephens Media was purchased by GateHouse Media for $102.8 million. In December 2015, GateHouse sold the Las Vegas Review-Journal, Stephens Media's largest paper, to casino magnate Sheldon Adelson for $140 million.

== History ==
The company was founded as Donrey Media Group by Arkansas media mogul Donald W. Reynolds and based in Fort Smith, Arkansas. After Reynolds died in 1993 at the age of 86, the company was sold to the Stephens family of Arkansas, known for their Little Rock investment banking business Stephens Inc.

Some of Donrey's properties were sold off, and the company moved its headquarters to Las Vegas, Nevada, home of its largest newspaper, the Las Vegas Review-Journal. The company was renamed Stephens Media Group in 2002. In June 2006, the company became known as Stephens Media LLC. The company has no connection with Stephens Media Group, a radio broadcasting company in Tulsa, Oklahoma.

== Copyright infringements ==
In 2010, Stephens Media contracted with the litigation firm Righthaven LLC, giving it the power to enforce the company's copyrights when online violators went beyond the bounds of fair use. More than 141 lawsuits were filed in U.S. District Court in Las Vegas.

In a column published in the RJ shortly after the lawsuits began, former publisher Sherman Frederick, said the primary goal with the partnership with Righthaven was to deter theft of the company's copyrighted materials. He said if the company was successful, he hoped Righthaven would find other media clients. Eventually, WEHCO Media, which owns the Arkansas Democrat-Gazette and the Chattanooga Times Free Press, signed on with the firm. MediaNews Group has also used Righthaven to file a copyright infringement suit.

The aggressive enforcement of the Stephens Media copyrights by Righthaven was being closely watched by other publishers, as is the debate it has generated. Critics of the relatively new practice have coined it 'copyright trolling', and argue that the purpose of such enforcement is to make a profit. In the Poynter article, former Stephens Media general counsel Mark Hinueber said the goal was to make sure the company's intellectual rights were protected. "We were seeing our entire work product in some stories just being right-clicked and cut and pasted into blogs, where people were selling Google ads around them and making money." The Las Vegas Sun thoroughly documented Righthaven's activities and the response. The Sun’s outside law firm, Lewis and Roca, defended several of the Righthaven suits.

Targets of the Righthaven lawsuits included bloggers, political forums, major political parties, and several of the newspaper's own sources including NORML, DailyPaul.com, InfoWars, Free Republic, and others. On August 25, 2010, the Electronic Frontier Foundation (EFF) announced that they would make efforts to assist Righthaven LLC defendants to the best of their ability.

Righthaven's lawsuits came under increasing judicial scrutiny, which led to Righthaven being found in June 2011 to lack standing to sue for alleged infringement of copyrighted material to which it holds only a limited license, as such a license does not confer the right to sue for infringement. Sanctions against Righthaven and its attorney, Steven A. Gibson, of Nevada law firm Dickinson Wright, were being contemplated by one judge. Righthaven later had its assets seized to pay judgments levied against it in lawsuits it filed against those whom it said infringed on the copyrights of clients. As a result, copyrights which had been "sold" by Stephens to Righthaven were "sold back" to Stephens for $80,000 to pay legal fees.

== Joint venture ==
In September 2009, Stephens Media and WEHCO Media Inc., owner of the Arkansas Democrat-Gazette, announced plans to combine their newspaper operations in Northwest Arkansas and operate as a single company. The venture was approved in November 2009 by the U.S. Justice Department, and a new Arkansas limited liability company, Northwest Arkansas Newspaper LLC, was formed. Stephens Media sold its interest in the joint venture to WEHCO on May 5, 2016, which then assumed all control of operations of the newspapers in the joint venture.

Newspapers in the joint venture included:

- The Springdale Morning News
- The Rogers Morning News
- Northwest Arkansas Times
- Benton County Daily Record

== Former Holdings ==
- Stephens Press
- Hawgs Illustrated magazine, Springdale, Ark., part of joint venture with WEHCO Media
- Luxury Las Vegas magazine, Las Vegas, Nevada
- Arkansasnews.com

=== Former newspapers by state ===
Arkansas

- Southwest Times Record, Fort Smith (DAILY)
1. Press Argus Courier, Van Buren (Weekly, Wed. & Sat.)
2. Booneville Democrat, Booneville (Weekly, Wed. & Sat.)
3. Charleston Express, Charleston (Weekly, Wed. & Sat.)
4. Greenwood Democrat, Greenwood (Weekly, Wed. & Sat.)
5. Paris Express, Paris (Weekly, Wed. & Sat.)
- Pine Bluff Commercial, Pine Bluff (DAILY)
1. White Hall Progress, White Hall (Weekly, Wed. & Sat.)
- Central Arkansas weeklies (group of weekly newspapers that operated under one publisher)
1. North Little Rock Times, North Little Rock (Weekly, Thurs.)
2. Jacksonville Patriot, Jacksonville (Weekly, Wed.)
3. Sherwood Voice, Sherwood (Weekly, Thurs.)
4. Maumelle Monitor, Maumelle (Weekly, Thurs.)
5. Cabot Star-Herald, Cabot (Weekly, Wed.)
6. Lonoke Democrat, Lonoke (Weekly, Thurs.)
7. Carlisle Independent, Carlisle (Weekly, Wed.)
8. Hot Springs Village Voice, Hot Springs Village (Weekly, Wed.)
9. Saline County Voice, Benton (Weekly, Thurs.)
10. Van Buren County Democrat, Clinton (Weekly, Thurs.)

Iowa

- Ames Tribune, Ames, IA (DAILY)
1. Boone News-Republican, Boone, IA (DAILY)
2. Dallas County News, (Weekly)
3. Algona Upper Des Moines, Algona, IA (Weekly)
4. Nevada Journal, Nevada, IA (Weekly)
5. Tri-County Times, Nevada, IA (Weekly)
6. Ames Sun, Ames, IA (Weekly)
7. Story County Advertiser, Ames, IA (Weekly)

Nevada

1. Ely Times, Ely, NV (Weekly, Fri.)
2. Rebel Nation, Las Vegas, NV (Monthly, 1st of month)
3. Eureka Sentinel, Eureka, NV (twice Weekly, Wed. & Fri.)
4. Lincoln County Record (Weekly)

North Carolina

- Courier-Tribune, Asheboro, NC (DAILY)

Oklahoma

- Bartlesville Examiner-Enterprise, Bartlesville, OK (DAILY)
1. Pawhuska Journal-Capital, Pawhuska, OK (twice Weekly, Wed. & Sat.)

Texas

- The Herald Democrat, Sherman/Denison TX (DAILY except Saturday)
1. Anna-Melissa Tribune, Anna, TX (Weekly)
2. Grayson County Shopper, Sherman, TX (Weekly)
3. Prosper Press, Prosper, TX (Weekly)
4. Van Alstyne Leader, Van Alstyne, TX (Weekly)
5. Lake Texoma Life, Kingston, TX (Monthly, 1st of month)

Tennessee

- The Daily Herald, Columbia, TN (DAILY)
1. The Advertiser News, Spring Hill, TN (Weekly, Wed.)
2. The Value Guide, Columbia, TN (Weekly, Tues.)
3. Franklin Life, Franklin, TN (Monthly, 15th of month)
4. Brentwood Life, Brentwood, TN (Monthly, 1st of month)
5. Healthy Living, Columbia, TN (Monthly, 3rd Wed. each month)

=== Former news bureaus ===
- Carson City, Nevada
- Washington, DC
- Little Rock, Arkansas
