= List of newspapers in Colorado =

This is a list of newspapers in the U.S. State of Colorado. According to the Library of Congress, over 2,500 newspapers have been published in Colorado. The first Colorado newspaper was the Rocky Mountain News published in Denver from April 23, 1859, until February 27, 2009.

== Daily and weekly newspapers (currently published in Colorado) ==
Larger newspapers (listed by total average paid daily circulation as of 30 September 2012 as compiled by the Audit Bureau of Circulations):

- The Denver Post (412,669) — Denver
- The Gazette (64,394) — Colorado Springs
- Daily Camera (40,483) — Boulder
- The Pueblo Chieftain (35,793) — Pueblo
- The Daily Sentinel (23,602) — Grand Junction
- Daily Times-Call (20,820) — Longmont
- The Coloradoan (19,530) — Fort Collins
- Reporter-Herald (19,024) — Loveland
- The Durango Herald (7,710) — Durango
- Cañon City Daily Record (5,271) — Cañon City

== Smaller newspapers ==
- Akron News-Reporter — Akron (weekly)
- Arvada Press — Arvada (weekly)
- Aspen Daily News — Aspen
- The Aspen Times - Aspen
- Aurora Sentinel — Aurora
- Bent County Democrat — Las Animas
- Berthoud Weekly Surveyor — Berthoud
- BizWest — Boulder
- Boulder Weekly — Boulder (weekly) 1993 - July 2025 summer hiatus
- Brighton Standard Blade — Brighton
- Broomfield Enterprise — Broomfield (semi-weekly)
- Brush News-Tribune — Brush (weekly)
- Burlington Record — Burlington (weekly)
- Canyon Courier — Conifer (weekly)
- The Castle Pines Connection — Castle Pines (monthly)
- Castle Pines News Press — Castle Pines (weekly)
- Castle Rock News Press — Castle Rock (weekly)
- Centennial Citizen — Centennial (weekly)
- Central City Register-Call — Black Hawk (weekly)
- Center Post Dispatch — Center
- The Chaffee County Times — Buena Vista
- Trinidad Chronicle-News — Trinidad
- Clear Creek Courant — Idaho Springs (weekly)
- Colorado Daily — Boulder
- Colorado Newsline — Denver
- Colorado Springs Independent — Colorado Springs (weekly)
- Colorado Sun — Colorado (on-line)
- Colorado Times Recorder — Denver
- Commerce City Sentinel Express — Commerce City
- The Craig Press — Craig
- The Crested Butte News — Crested Butte
- The Crystal Valley Echo — Marble, Colorado
- Delta County Independent — Delta
- Denver Business Journal — Denver
- Denver Herald Dispatch — Denver (weekly)
- The Denver North Star — Denver
- Douglas County News-Press — Castle Rock
- Dove Creek Press — Dove Creek, Dolores County
- The Durango Telegraph — Durango
- Eagle Valley Enterprise — Eagle
- Elbert County News — Elizabeth (weekly)
- Englewood Herald — Englewood (weekly)
- Estes Park Trail-Gazette — Estes Park (weekly)
- Fort Lupton Press — Fort Lupton
- Fort Morgan Times — Fort Morgan
- The Fowler Tribune — Fowler
- Glendale Cherry Creek Chronicle — Denver, Glendale
- Golden Transcript — Golden (weekly)
- Gorizont — Denver (Russian)
- Greeley Tribune — Greeley
- Gunnison Country Times — Gunnison
- Haxtun-Fleming Herald — Haxtun
- The Herald Democrat — Leadville
- High Country News — Paonia (semi-monthly)
- Highlands Ranch Herald — Highlands Ranch (weekly)
- Intermountain Jewish News — Denver (weekly)
- Jeffco Transcript — Lakewood (weekly)
- The Johnstown Breeze — Johnstown
- The Journal — Cortez, Dolores, and Mancos
- Journal-Advocate — Sterling
- Julesburg Advocate — Julesburg (weekly)
- Kiowa County Press — Eads
- La Junta Tribune Democrat — La Junta
- La Prensa de Colorado — Denver (Spanish)
- La Voz Bilingüe — Denver (Bilingual weekly)
- Lamar Ledger — Lamar (weekly)
- Law Week Colorado — Denver (weekly)
- Left Hand Valley Courier — Niwot, Colorado (weekly)
- Life on Capitol Hill — Capitol Hill, Denver (monthly)
- Littleton Independent — Littleton (weekly)
- Lone Tree Voice — Lone Tree (weekly)
- The Lyons Recorder — Lyons
- Monte Vista Journal — Monte Vista
- Montrose Press — Montrose
- The Mountain Ear — Nederland
- The Mountain Jackpot — Woodland Park (weekly)
- The Mountain Mail — Salida
- Mountain Standard Times — Fort Collins
- North Denver Tribune — Denver
- North Forty News — Wellington
- The North Weld Herald — Eaton
- Northglenn/Thornton Sentinel — Thornton (weekly)
- Ouray County Plaindealer — Ouray (weekly)
- Our Community News - El Paso County (monthly)
- Out Front Colorado — Denver (bi-weekly)
- Pagosa Daily Post — Pagosa Springs
- The Pagosa Springs Sun — Pagosa Springs
- Parker Chronicle — Parker (weekly)
- The Pikes Peak Courier — Teller County
- The Pikes Peak Bulletin - Manitou Springs, Cascade and Green Mountain Falls
- Pine River Times — Bayfield
- Post Independent Citizen Telegram — Glenwood Springs and Rifle
- Redstone Review - Lyons, Colorado (Monthly)
- Rio Blanco Herald Times — Meeker Rangely
- Saguache Crescent — Saguache
- Silverton Standard & The Miner — Silverton
- Sky-Hi News — Granby
- Snowmass Sun — Snowmass
- The Sopris Sun — Carbondale
- Steamboat Pilot & Today — Steamboat Springs
- Summit Daily News — Frisco
- Telluride Daily Planet — Telluride
- The Telluride Watch — Telluride
- The Tribune — Monument, Woodmore, and Gleneagle
- Vail Daily — Vail
- Valley Courier — Alamosa
- The Villager — Greenwood Village
- Washington Park Profile — Washington Park, Denver (monthly)
- Westminster Window — Westminster (weekly)
- The Westside Pioneer — Colorado Springs
- Westword — Denver (weekly)
- Wet Mountain Tribune — Westcliffe
- Windsor Now — Windsor
- World Journal — Walsenburg

== University Newspapers ==
- The Catalyst — Colorado College (Colorado Springs)
- CougMedia — Colorado Christian University (Lakewood)
- The Criteron — Colorado Mesa University (Grand Junction)
- CU Independent — University of Colorado Boulder (Boulder)
- The Denver Clarion — University of Denver (Denver)
- The Highlander — Regis University (Denver)
- The Independent — Fort Lewis College (Durango)
- The Metropolitan — Metropolitan State University of Denver (Denver)
- The Oredigger — Colorado School of Mines (Golden)
- The Paw Print — Adams State University (Alamosa)
- Rocky Mountain Collegian — Colorado State University (Fort Collins)
- The Scribe — University of Colorado Colorado Springs (Colorado Springs)
- The Sentry — University of Colorado Denver (Denver)
- The Today — Colorado State University Pueblo (Pueblo)
- Top o' the World — Western Colorado University (Gunnison)
- The Mirror — University of Northern Colorado (Greeley)

== Defunct newspapers ==
- The Advocate — Denver
- Animas Forks Pioneer — Animas Forks (1882–1886)
- The Aspen Wall Poster — Denver
- Boulder County Business Report — Boulder
- Boulder Planet (weekly; July 10, 1996 - February 16, 2000) - Boulder
- Brighton Banner — Brighton
- The Campus Press — University of Colorado at Boulder
- Cañon Cafe — Cañon City
- Cherry Creek Pioneer — Denver (1859)
- Colorado Springs Business Journal
- Colorado Mountaineer Established 1875
- Colorado Springs Sun
- The Colorado Statesman — Denver
- Conejos County Citizen — Conejos County (ceased in 2024)
- La Cucaracha (newspaper) — Pueblo
- Denver Daily News
- Denver Democrat — Denver
- The Denver Times (1872-1926)
- El Paso County Advertiser and Fountain Valley News — Fountain
- Erie Echo (weekly; Dec. 1977-1980)
- Fort Collins Now
- Grand Junction Free Press — Grand Junction
- Lafayette News — Lafayette
- Leadville Chronicle — Leadville
- Local Yeti — Denver (daily)
- Louisville Times — Louisville
- The Meadowlark Herald — Elizabeth
- Mile High News — Golden
- Moffat County News — Craig
- Mountain Valley News — Cedaredge
- Northern Colorado Business Report — Fort Collins
- The Pagosa Free Press — Pagosa Springs
- Press - Pueblo (democratic evening paper, end of 19th century)
- The Rico Bugle — Rico
- Rocky Mountain News — Denver
- Rolling Stock — Boulder
- Sangre de Cristo Sentinel — Westcliffe (weekly)
- Superior Observer — Superior
- The Trinidad Times Independent — Trinidad
- The UNC Connection — Greeley
- The Vail Trail — Vail

== See also ==
Comprehensive

- Lists of newspapers
- List of newspapers in the United States

Frequency

- List of free daily newspapers in the United States
- List of weekly newspapers in the United States

Circulation

- List of international newspapers originating in the United States
- List of national newspapers in the United States
- List of newspapers in the United States by circulation

Foreign language

- List of French-language newspapers published in the United States
- List of German-language newspapers published in the United States
- List of Spanish-language newspapers published in the United States

Specialty

- List of African-American newspapers in the United States
- List of alternative weekly newspapers in the United States
- List of business newspapers in the United States
- List of family-owned newspapers in the United States
- List of Jewish newspapers in the United States
- List of LGBTQ periodicals in the United States
- List of student newspapers in the United States
- List of supermarket tabloids in the United States
- List of underground press in the United States

Other

- List of defunct newspapers of the United States
- List of African-American newspapers in Colorado
