= 2018 Colorado Secretary of State election =

- November 6, 2018
- Registered: 3,953,613
- Turnout: 64.92%
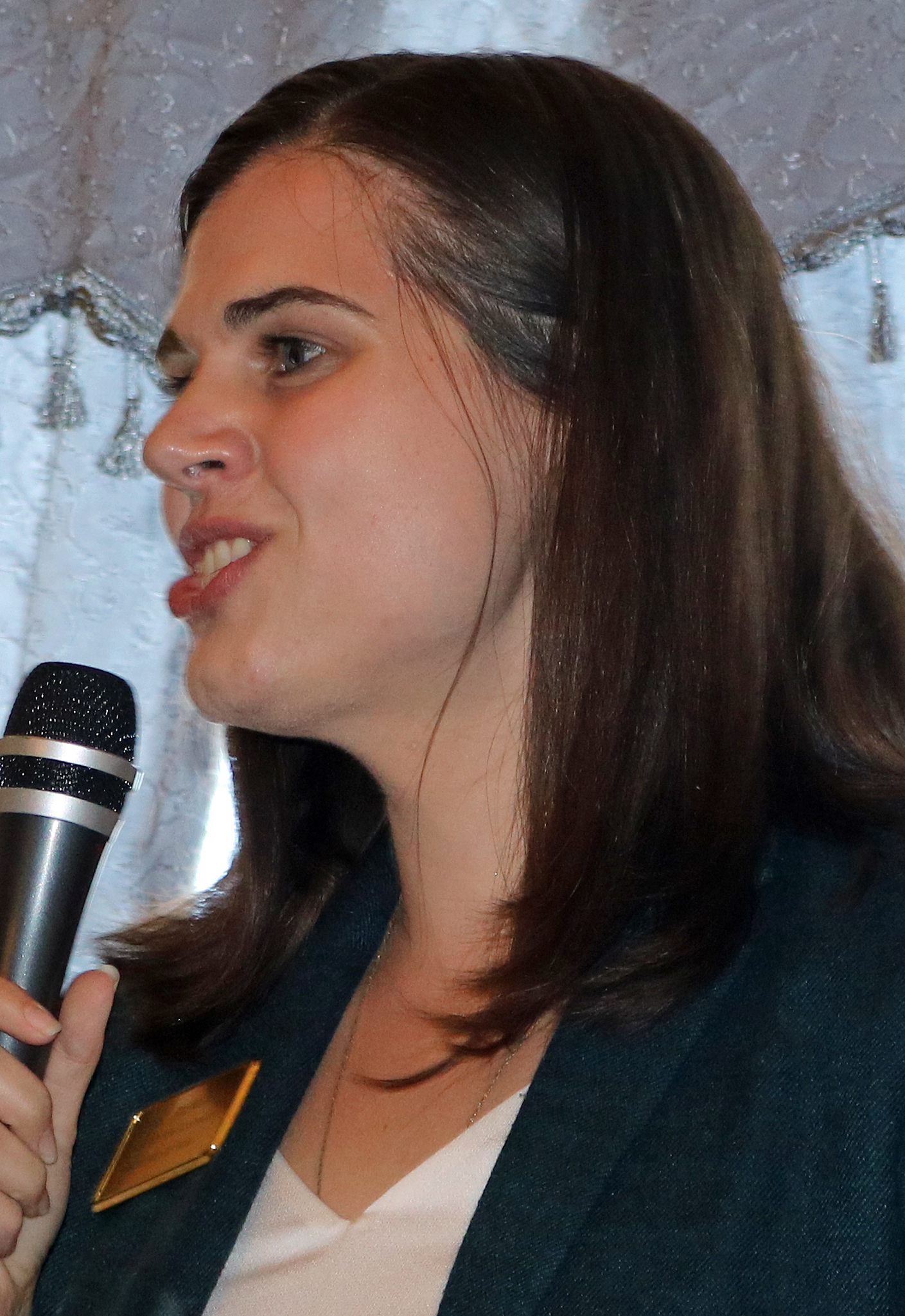

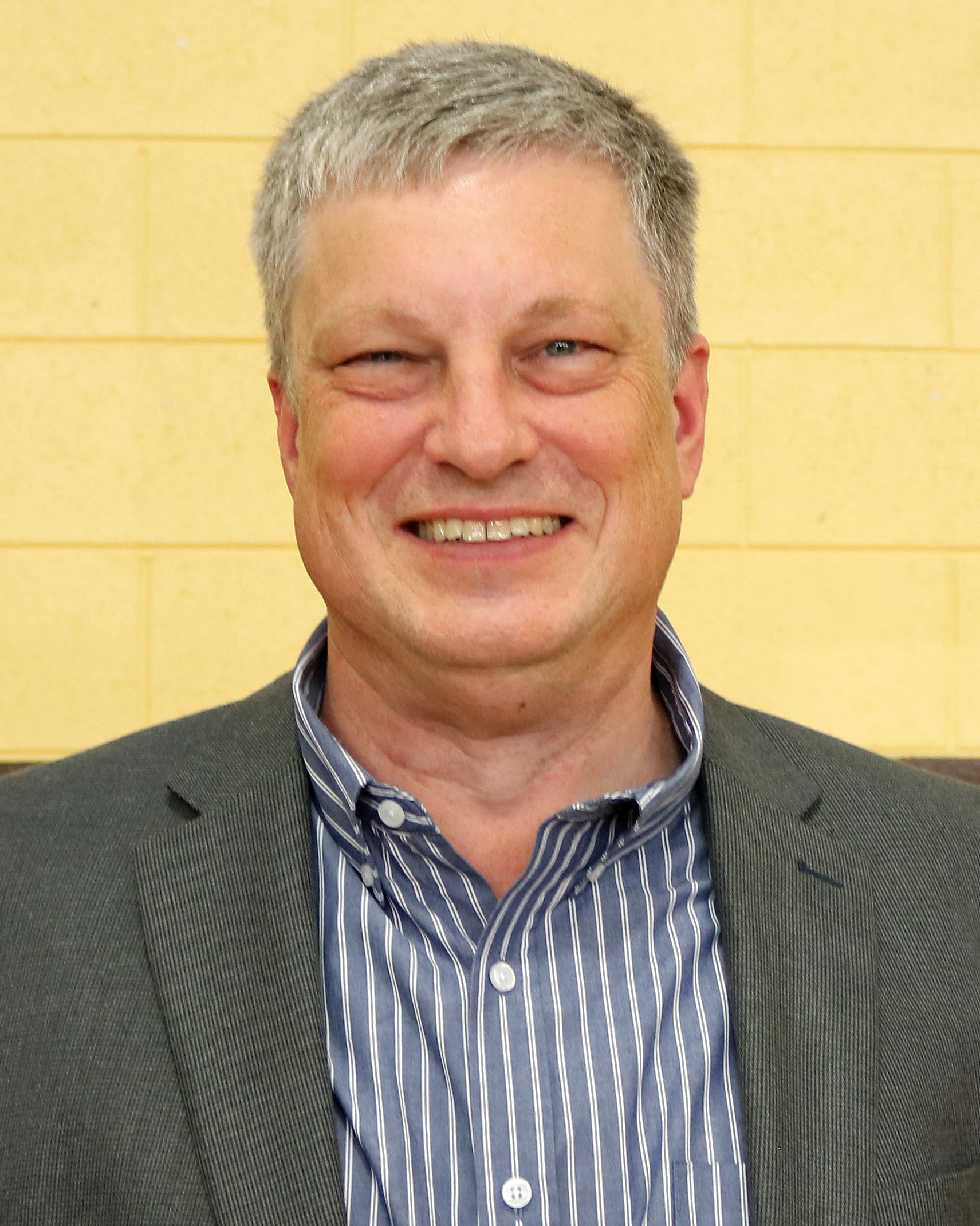
Candidate	Jena Griswold	Wayne Williams
Party	Democratic	Republican
Popular vote	1,313,716	1,113,927
Percentage	52.70%	44.69%
- County results Griswold: 40–50% 50–60% 60–70% 70–80% Williams: 40–50% 50–60% 60–70% 70–80% 80–90%
Secretary of State before election
Wayne Williams
Republican
Elected Secretary of State
Jena Griswold
Democratic

The 2018 Colorado Secretary of State election was held on November 6, 2018, to elect the Secretary of State of Colorado, concurrently with elections to the United States House of Representatives, governor, and other state and local elections. Primary elections were held on June 26, 2018. A debate was held by KOAA-TV on October 13, 2018.

Incumbent Republican secretary Wayne Williams ran for re-election to a second term in office, but was defeated by Democratic attorney Jena Griswold. Griswold outraised Williams throughout the campaign. Williams' compliance with a voter fraud commission by the first Trump administration was a key issue throughout the campaign, along with election security. Griswold became the first Democrat to be elected as the Colorado secretary of state since George Baker in 1958.

== Republican primary ==
=== Candidates ===
==== Nominee ====
- Wayne Williams, incumbent secretary of state (2015–present) and former El Paso County recorder (2011–2015)

=== Results ===
Republican primary results
Party	Candidate	Votes	%
Republican	Wayne Williams (incumbent)	414,926	100.0%
Total votes		414,926	100.0%

== Democratic primary ==
=== Candidates ===
==== Nominee ====
- Jena Griswold, attorney and former election attorney for Barack Obama's presidential campaign

==== Withdrew before primary ====
- Phillip Villard, activist

=== Endorsements ===
Jena Griswold

Executive branch officials

- Ken Salazar, former United States secretary of the interior (2009–2013), U.S. senator from Colorado (2005–2009), and Colorado attorney general (1999–2005)

U.S. representatives

- Ed Perlmutter, U.S. representative from Colorado's 7th congressional district (2007–present)
- Jared Polis, U.S. representative from Colorado's 2nd congressional district (2009–present)

State officials

- Jason Kander, former Missouri secretary of state (2013–2017) and state representative from the 44th district (2009–2013)
- Cary Kennedy, former Colorado state treasurer (2007–2011)

State senators

- Steve Fenberg, state senator from the 18th district (2017–present)
- Joyce Foster, state senator from the 35th district (2009–2013)
- Lucía Guzmán, minority leader of the Colorado Senate (2015–present) and state senator from the 34th district (2010–present)
- Mike Johnston, state senator from the 33rd district (2009–2017)
- Lois Tochtrop, state senator from the 24th district (2007–2015)

State representatives

- KC Becker, majority leader of the Colorado House of Representatives (2017–present) and state representative from the 13th district (2013–present)
- Janet Buckner, state representative from the 40th district (2015–present)
- Jessie Danielson, speaker pro tempore of the Colorado House of Representatives (2017–present) and state representative from the 24th district (2015–present)
- Chris Hansen, state representative from the 6th district (2017–present)
- Claire Levy, state representative from the 13th district (2007–2013)
- Dafna Michaelson Jenet, state representative from the 30th district (2017–present)
- Dylan Roberts, state representative from the 26th district (2017–present)

District attorneys

- Jeff Chostner, district attorney for Colorado's 10th judicial district
- Stan Garnett, district attorney for Colorado's 20th judicial district

Local officials

- Aaron Brockett, Boulder city councilor
- Eva Henry, Adams County commissioner
- Robin Kneich, Denver City councilor
- Steve O'Dorisio, Adams County commissioner
- Joe Pelle, sheriff of Boulder County
- Ashley Stolzmann, Louisville city councilor
- Wellington Webb, former mayor of Denver (1991–2003)

Individuals

- Auon'tai Anderson, community organizer and candidate for the Denver Public Schools Board
- Dottie Lamm, First Lady of Colorado (1975–1987) and nominee for U.S. Senate in 1998

Unions

- Denver Pipefitters Local 208
- Plumbers Local Union 3

Organizations

- EMILY's List
- Let America Vote

=== Results ===
Democratic primary results
Party	Candidate	Votes	%
Democratic	Jena Griswold	510,903	100.0%
Total votes		510,903	100.0%

== General election ==
=== Post-primary endorsements ===
Wayne Williams (R)

State representatives

- Joe Rice, state representative from the 38th district (2007–2011) (Democratic)

Local officials

- Kim Bonner, clerk and recorder of Routt County (Democratic)
- Nancy Cruz, clerk and recorder of Huerfano County (Democratic)
- Patti Nickell, clerk and recorder of Bent County (Democratic)
- Sharon Sisnroy, clerk and recorder of Otero County (Democratic)
- Peach Vigil, clerk and recorder of Las Animas County (Democratic)

Newspapers and other media

- The Aspen Times
- The Aurora Sentinel
- Colorado Springs Independent
- The Coloradoan
- The Daily Sentinel (Grand Junction)
- The Denver Post
- The Durango Herald
- The Gazette (Colorado Springs)
- Greeley Tribune
- The Mountain Mail
- The Pueblo Chieftain
- Yellow Scene
Jena Griswold (D)

U.S. presidents

- Barack Obama, president of the United States (2009–2017) and U.S. senator from Illinois (2005–2008)

Executive branch officials

- Joe Biden, vice president of the United States (2009–2017) and U.S. senator from Delaware (1973–2009)

Local officials

- Gilbert Ortiz, clerk and recorder of Pueblo County
- Nathan Ruybal, clerk and recorder of Conejos County
- Kathryn Simillion, clerk and recorder of Gunnison County

Newspapers and other media

- Boulder Weekly
- Estes Park Trail-Gazette

Organizations

- Planned Parenthood Action Fund

=== Predictions ===
Source	Ranking	As of
Governing	Lean R	October 11, 2018

=== Results ===
2018 Colorado secretary of state election
Party	Candidate	Votes	%
Democratic	Jena Griswold	1,313,716	52.70%
Republican	Wayne Williams (incumbent)	1,113,927	44.69%
Constitution	Amanda Campbell	51,734	2.08%
Approval Voting	Blake Huber	13,258	0.53%
Total votes		2,492,635	100.00%
Democratic gain from Republican			
