= 2020 Colorado Proposition EE =

Proposition EE
- Taxes on Nicotine Products

Results
Choice	Votes	%
Yes	2,134,608	67.56%
No	1,025,182	32.44%
Valid votes	3,159,790	95.88%
Invalid or blank votes	135,876	4.12%
Total votes	3,295,666	100.00%
Registered voters/turnout	3,793,790	86.87%

For
90–100%
80–90%
70–80%
60–70%
50–60%
Against
90–100%
70–80%
60–70%
50–60%
Other
Tie
No data
- Source: Colorado Public Radio

Colorado Proposition EE (also the Taxes on Nicotine Products Proposition) was a legislative referendum that appeared on ballots in Colorado in the November 2020 elections. It was a proposal to increase taxes on nicotine products and place a new tax on vaping products.

== Proposal ==
Proposition EE originates from HB20-1427, a law that would increase taxes on cigarettes and nicotine products. As all tax increases have to be approved by voters under the Colorado Constitution, a Proposition was needed for the law to enter into effect.

The Proposition raises taxes on cigarettes and tobacco products, and levies a new tax on nicotine products. Under the proposal, these increases would be phased in between 2021 and 2027, resulting in a tax on cigarettes of $2.64 per pack (up from $0.84), a tax on other tobacco products of 62% of the price which they are sold to retailers at (up from 40%) and a new tax on nicotine products, also set at 62%. Additionally, the Proposition raised the minimum sale price of various nicotine products.

It is estimated that Proposition EE would generate up to $175.6m extra tax in its first budget year, rising to $275.9m by the time the new rates are fully in place. This would be used to increase funding for free preschool provision (an election pledge of Governor Jared Polis) as well as being used in rural schools, K-12 education, housing development, and general state spending.

== Campaign ==
=== Support ===
HB20-1427, the legislation which put Proposition EE on the ballot, was sponsored by Representatives Yadira Caraveo and Julie McCluskie and Senators Rhonda Fields and Dominick Moreno.

==== Endorsements ====
'Yes'

State legislators

- Yadira Caraveo, member of the Colorado House of Representatives for District 31
- Rhonda Fields, member of the Colorado Senate for District 29
- Mike Johnston, former member of the Colorado Senate for District 33
- Chris Kennedy, member of the Colorado House of Representatives for District 23
- Julie McCluskie, member of the Colorado House of Representatives for District 61
- Jared Polis, Governor of Colorado
- Tammy Story, member of the Colorado Senate for District 16

Newspapers

- Aspen Daily News
- Colorado Springs Gazette
- The Denver Post
- The Durango Herald
- The Durango Telegraph
- Grand Junction Daily Sentinel
- Journal Advocate
- Sentinel Colorado

Organisations

- American Federation of Teachers Colorado
- American Lung Association
- Colorado Democratic Party
- Colorado Education Association
- Mental Health Colorado
- Denver Metro Chamber of Commerce
- Women's Foundation of Colorado

=== Opposition ===
Opposition to Proposition EE mainly centered around opposition to increasing taxes in general but specifically because the Proposition was seen to be a sin tax. It was also noted by progressive groups who opposed the Proposition, such as the Working Families Party, that it would disproportionately affect poorer and working-class people, because they were more targeted by tobacco companies.

==== Endorsements ====
'No'

State legislators

- John Cooke, member of the Colorado Senate for District 13

Local politicians

- Françoise Bergan, member of Aurora City Council

Newspapers

- Boulder Weekly
- Greeley Tribune
- Steamboat Pilot & Today

Organisations

- Board of Weld County Commissioners
- Working Families Party of Colorado

=== Neutral ===
Neutral
- Evangelical Lutheran Church in America

== Results ==
=== Ballot question ===
The question put to voters was:

Shall state taxes be increased by $294,000,000 annually by imposing a tax on nicotine liquids used in e-cigarettes and other vaping products that is equal to the total state tax on tobacco products when fully phased in, incrementally increasing the tobacco products tax by up to 22% of the manufacturer's list price, incrementally increasing the cigarette tax by up to 9 cents per cigarette, expanding the existing cigarette and tobacco taxes to apply to sales to consumers from outside of the state, establishing a minimum tax for moist snuff tobacco products, creating an inventory tax that applies for future cigarette tax increases, and initially using the tax revenue primarily for public school funding to help offset revenue that has been lost as a result of the economic impacts related to COVID-19 and then for programs that reduce the use of tobacco and nicotine products, enhance the voluntary Colorado Preschool Program and make it widely available for free, and maintain the funding for programs that currently receive revenue from tobacco taxes, with the state keeping and spending all of the new tax revenue as a voter-approved revenue change?

=== Results ===
Taxes on Nicotine Products
Choice	Votes	%
For	2,134,608	67.56
Against	1,025,182	32.44
Total	3,159,790	100.00
Valid votes	3,159,790	95.88
Invalid/blank votes	135,876	4.12
Total votes	3,295,666	100.00
Registered voters/turnout	3,793,790	86.87

== See also ==
- 2023 Colorado Proposition II
- Cigarette taxes in the United States
- List of Colorado ballot measures
