= 2016 Colorado Proposition 107 =

Ballot measure legalizing assisted dying in Colorado

- November 8, 2016
- Presidential Primary Elections Initiative

Results
Choice	Votes	%
Yes	1,701,599	64.09%
No	953,246	35.91%
Total votes	2,654,845	100.00%
Results by county
Yes
70–80%
60–70%
50–60%
No
60–70%
50–60%

Proposition 107, also known as the Presidential Primary Elections Initiative, was an initiated state statute that appeared on the November 8, 2016, ballot in the state of Colorado. The measure, which was approved by nearly 65% of voters, re-established presidential primaries and opened them up to unaffiliated voters.

== Background ==
During a special legislative session called by then-governor John F. Shafroth in August 1910, Colorado's state legislature approved the introduction of a caucus system, in an appeal to increase grassroots involvement in state politics. The system was used until 1992, when caucuses were abolished in favor of presidential primaries, though they were restored in 2002 and went on to be used in the 2004 election cycle. Prior to the passing of Proposition 107, Colorado had not held a presidential primary since 2000.

To participate in the Colorado caucuses, voters had to have been affiliated with a political party for at least two months to be eligible to vote in that party's caucus or convention. During the concurrently-held 2016 presidential election, Democrats in Colorado voted for their preferred presidential candidate—Bernie Sanders—in a caucus, while Republicans held district conventions, won by Ted Cruz.

=== Effect ===
Proposition 107 established presidential primaries, which were opened to unaffiliated voters. The proposition's fiscal impact statement on the ballot estimated that the Colorado secretary of state's spending would increase by $210,000 in the 2018–2019 financial year, then by $2.7 million in then 2019–2020 financial year (when the next presidential primaries took place). The fiscal impact statement also estimated that Colorado counties would spend $5.3 million in the 2019–2020 financial year, though counties were reimbursed almost half of that by the state.

== Endorsements ==
Yes

U.S. senators

- Mark Udall, former U.S. senator from Colorado (2009–2015) (Democratic)

Statewide officials

- John Hickenlooper, governor of Colorado (2011–2019) (Democratic)
- Richard Lamm, former governor of Colorado (1975–1987) (Democratic)
- Bill Owens, former governor of Colorado (1999–2007) (Republican)
- Bill Ritter, former governor of Colorado (2007–2011) (Democratic)

State legislators

- Josh Penry, former state senator from the 7th district (2007–2011) (Republican)

Newspapers

- Coloradoan
- Colorado Springs Gazette
- Colorado Springs Independent
- Daily Camera
- Greeley Tribune
- Steamboat Pilot & Today
- The Daily Sentinel
- The Denver Post
No

State legislators

- Ted Harvey, former state senator from the 30th district (2007–2015) (Republican)
- Kevin Grantham, state senator from the 2nd district (2011–2019) (Republican)

Party officials

- Rick Palacio, chair of the Colorado Democratic Party (2011–2017)

Newspapers

- Longmont Times-Call
- Loveland Reporter-Herald

== Polling ==
Poll source	Date(s) administered	Sample size (Note: Key: A – all adults RV – registered voters LV – likely voters V – unclear)	Margin of error	Yes	No	Undecided
Magellan Strategies (R)	August 29–31, 2016	500 (RV)	± 4.38%	54%	36%	10%

== Results ==
Proposition 107
Choice	Votes	%
For	1,701,599	64.09
Against	953,246	35.91
Total	2,654,845	100.00
Source: Colorado Secretary of State
