= 2020 Colorado Amendment C =

Amendment C
- Charitable Bingo and Raffles Amendment
- Outcome: Failed to pass 55% threshold

Results
Choice	Votes	%
Yes	1,586,973	52.35%
No	1,444,553	47.65%
Valid votes	3,031,526	91.99%
Invalid or blank votes	264,140	8.01%
Total votes	3,295,666	100.00%
Registered voters/turnout	3,793,790	86.87%

For
80–90%
70–80%
60–70%
50–60%
Against
80–90%
70–80%
60–70%
50–60%
Other
Tie
No data

Colorado Amendment C (also known as the Charitable Bingo and Raffles Amendment) was a 2020 referendum to amend Section 2 of Article XVIII of the Colorado Constitution. The amendment would have changed the rules governing the conduct of charitable gaming activities (bingo, pull-tab games, and raffles). The amendment failed because it did not receive the 55% of the valid vote required to add to the Constitution.

== Contents ==
The amendment appeared on the ballot as follows:

Shall there be an amendment to the Colorado constitution concerning the conduct of charitable gaming activities, and, in connection therewith, allowing bingo-raffle licensees to hire managers and operators of games and reducing the required period of a charitable organization's continuous existence before obtaining a charitable gaming license?

== Support and Opposition ==
The amendment was supported by the Colorado Charitable Gaming Association. Boulder Weekly, The Vail Daily, The Durango Herald, The Steamboat Pilot & Today, and The Journal-Advocate and The Fort Morgan Times ran editorials in support of the amendment.

The Colorado Springs Indy ran an editorial in opposition of the amendment.

== Results ==
Amendment C
Choice	Votes	%
Yes	1,586,973	52.35
No	1,444,553	47.65
Required majority		55
Total	3,031,526	100.00
Registered voters/turnout	3,793,790	86.87
Source: https://results.enr.clarityelections.com/CO/105975/web.264614/#/detail/1106
