= Prairie Mountain Media =

American publishing company

- Industry: News Publication; Interactive Media
- Founded: 2006
- Headquarters: Boulder, Colorado, USA
- Key people: Al Manzi
- Revenue: USD (2007)
- Owner: Digital First Media
- Website: prairiemountainmedia.com

Prairie Mountain Media is an American publishing company owned by Digital First Media. It owns a series of newspapers most notably The Denver Post. Digital First Media is owned by Alden Global Capital which has sharply cut costs by reducing the number of journalists working on many of its newspapers.

== History ==
In 2006, E. W. Scripps Company and MediaNews Group, Inc. formed a partnership to operate both of the companies' newspapers based in Eastern Colorado. Each company would control a 50% stake in newly created Colorado Publishing Co.

In 2009, MediaNews Group gained full ownership of the company, which at some point was renamed to Prairie Mountain Media.

The company acquired Lehman Communications in 2011 and the Greeley Tribune from Swift Communications in 2020.

In June 2024, the company announced it will shutter its printing plant in Berthoud and move production of its papers to The Denver Post's production facility. As a result, 40 employees will be let go.

== Prairie Mountain Media newspapers ==
The company owns the following newspapers in Colorado:

- Akron News-Reporter (Akron, Colorado)
- Broomfield Enterprise (Broomfield, Colorado)
- Brush News-Tribune (Brush, Colorado)
- Burlington Record (Burlington, Colorado)
- Cañon City Daily Record (Cañon City, Colorado)
- Colorado Daily (Boulder, Colorado)
- Colorado Hometown Weekly (Erie/Lafayette/Louisville/Superior, Colorado)
- Daily Camera (Boulder, Colorado)
- Denver Post (Denver, Colorado)
- Estes Park Trail-Gazette (Estes Park, Colorado)
- The Fort Morgan Times (Fort Morgan, Colorado)
- Greeley Tribune (Greeley, Colorado)
- Journal-Advocate (Sterling, Colorado)
- Julesburg Advocate (Julesburg, Colorado)
- Lamar Ledger (Lamar, Colorado)
- Longmont Times-Call (Longmont, Colorado)
- Loveland Reporter-Herald (Loveland, Colorado)
- South Platte Sentinel (Logan County, Colorado)
