= South Platte Sentinel =

- Type: Weekly newspaper
- Owner(s): MediaNews Group
- Founder(s): Delinda Korrey and Ken McDowell
- Publisher: Prairie Mountain Media
- Founded: 1988
- Website: southplattesentinel.com

The South Platte Sentinel is a newspaper serving Logan County, Colorado since 1988. It was founded by Delinda Korrey and Ken McDowell.
