= KROO (AM) =

Coordinates: 32°47′32″N 98°56′24″W

Breckenridge, Texas; United States
- Frequency: 1430 kHz
- Branding: Talk Radio 1430 AM

Programming
- Format: Defunct (formerly News/Talk)

Ownership
- Owner: Terry and Kay Slavens; (For the Love of the Game Broadcasting, LLC)
- Sister stations: KLXK, KSWA, KWKQ

History
- First air date: 1947
- Former call signs: KSTB (1947-93); KBIL (1993-97)
- Call sign meaning: K BuckaROO (the mascot for Breckenridge High School)

Technical information
- Licensing authority: FCC
- Facility ID: 7703
- Class: D
- Power: 640 watts (day); 17 watts (night)

Links
- Public license information: Public file; LMS
- Website: www.hpr.network/texas

KROO (1430 AM) was a radio station with a news/talk format, licensed to Breckenridge, Texas.

== History ==
KROO was licensed in 1947 as KSTB. It was owned by Stephens County Broadcasting Company and operated as a daytimer with 500 watts, later increased to 1,000.

In 1956, the original owners sold the station to Coy Perry and C.M. Hatch, who sold to Hugh McBeath the next year. Breckenridge Radio acquired KSTB in 1963. Regal Broadcasting Corporation (in 1967) and Bintz Broadcasting (in 1979) were later owners.

In 1993, KSTB became KBIL, with the call sign changed to KROO in 1997.

On November 17, 2003, KROO changed its format from soft adult contemporary to oldies. It flipped to adult contemporary on April 23, 2007 and to news/talk on January 10, 2017.

On August 29, 2023, KROO's license was surrendered to the Federal Communications Commission, who cancelled it the same day.
