= KSWA =

Graham, Texas; United States
- Frequency: 1330 kHz
- Branding: Talk Radio 1330

Programming
- Format: Defunct (formerly Talk radio)

Ownership
- Owner: Terry and Kay Slavens; (For the Love of the Game Broadcasting, LLC)
- Sister stations: KLXK, KROO, KWKQ

History
- First air date: 1948; 78 years ago

Technical information
- Licensing authority: FCC
- Facility ID: 35644
- Class: D
- Power: 500 watts (day); 51 watts (night)
- Transmitter coordinates: 33.127°N 98.5932°W

Links
- Public license information: Public file; LMS
- Website: www.hpr.network/texas

KSWA 1330 AM was a radio station licensed to serve Graham, Texas. The station aired a News Talk format in a simulcast with KROO Breckenridge, Texas. Both stations were owned by Terry and Kay Slavens, through licensee For the Love of the Game Broadcasting, LLC.

On August 29, 2023, both KSWA's and KROO's licenses were surrendered to the Federal Communications Commission; the FCC cancelled the licenses the same day.
