= Broomfield Enterprise =

Newspaper published in Broomfield, Colorado

- Type: Weekly newspaper
- Format: Broadsheet
- Owner: Prairie Mountain Publishing (MediaNews Group)
- Founder(s): Albert F. Martin; Rosann M. Doran
- Publisher: Al Manzi
- Editor: Michael Hicks
- Founded: 1975
- Language: English
- Headquarters: 3350 Araphoe Ave; Boulder, CO 80303; United States
- Website: broomfieldenterprise.com

The Broomfield Enterprise is the weekly newspaper in Broomfield, Colorado, United States. It is published on Sundays by Prairie Mountain Publishing, which is owned by MediaNews Group.

== History ==
On October 8, 1975, the first issue of the Free Enterprise was published in Broomfield, Colorado. Albert F. Martin was publisher and Rosann M. Doran was editor. In 1977, Martin acquired the Tri-City Journal from Milton I. Wick and merged his two papers together to form The Broomfield Enterprise.

In 1979, Martin sold the Enterprise to Community Publications Co., a subsidiary of The Star Tribune Company. At that time the paper was freely disturbed and had a circulation of 12,000. Following the sale, H. Harrison Cochran was named editor and general manager.

In 1991, Cowles Media Company sold the Enterprise to Knight Ridder, owners of Boulder Daily Camera. In 1997, E. W. Scripps Company acquired the Daily Camera and Enterprise in a trade for two California papers. In 2006, Scripps and MediaNews Group formed a joint venture called Prairie Mountain Media which would manage their smaller newspapers in Colorado. In 2009, the partnership dissolved and MediaNews assumed full control of the subsidiary.

In 2019, a city park was named after Doran, the paper's first editor.

== Notable coverage ==
The 1994 resignation of Broomfield mayor Bob Schulze was attributed to the Enterprise's reporting on his personal use of a city-issued cell phone, which had resulted in $5,707 of charges.
