= Burlington Record =

Newspaper in Burlington, Colorado

- Type: Weekly newspaper
- Format: Broadsheet
- Owner: Prairie Mountain Publishing (MediaNews Group)
- Publisher: John Van Nostrand
- Founded: 1888
- Ceased publication: July 25, 2024
- Headquarters: 202 South 14th St. Burlington, Colorado 80807; United States
- OCLC number: 15651883
- Website: burlington-record.com

The Burlington Record is a weekly newspaper in Burlington, Colorado, US since 1888. It was published by Prairie Mountain Publishing, which is owned by MediaNews Group, until 2024. The paper ceased was revived by Tom Bredehoft. The paper's coverage extended to Bethune, Stratton and Seibert.

== History ==
The Burlington Record was founded in 1888. Prairie Mountain Media closed the paper on July 25, 2024. However, Tom Bredehoft, owner of The Flagler News and Mile Saver Shopper, legally claimed the publication’s name and resumed printing of the Burlington Record in August. But then Bredehoft ceased publishing his other two papers in December after his two biggest advertisers pulled support. By then the Burlington Record was renamed to The Record, and coverage had been expanded regionally.
