= Sharon Herbaugh =

American journalist (1954–1993)

Sharon Kay Herbaugh (January 28, 1954 – April 16, 1993) was an American journalist and war correspondent for the Associated Press. She was the Associated Press bureau chief in Islamabad, Pakistan, at the time of her death. Herbaugh was killed while on an assignment when she was traveling with 14 other people, including freelance journalist Natasha Singh and translator Mohammad Rafie, and their helicopter crashed into the side of a mountain near Pul-e Khomri, north of Kabul. Aid workers recovered the bodies from a ravine hours after the crash. The accident cause was later deemed engine failure. Herbaugh was the AP's first female bureau chief to be killed while on assignment for the Associated Press. She remained the AP's only female journalist to be killed in the line of duty until the 2014 death of Pulitzer Prize-winning photojournalist Anja Niedringhaus, who was shot and killed while covering the presidential elections in Afghanistan.

== Early life ==
Herbaugh was born in Lamar, Colorado, and lived here until attending college at Baylor University in Waco, Texas, where she obtained a bachelor's degree in journalism and served as an editor of the Baylor Lariat. She was a trained pianist.

== Career ==
She started working at the Associated Press in 1978 as a vacation relief staffer in Denver, Colorado. She was moved to bureaus in Dallas, Houston and the International Desk in New York City before taking her first foreign posting in 1988 as news editor in New Delhi, India. In 1990, she was promoted to the bureau chief role in Islamabad, Pakistan. Herbaugh covered big stories of the subcontinent, including the Soviet withdrawal from Afghanistan, the country's subsequent civil was and rising insurgencies from the Taliban and Mujahideen. Herbaugh's last story was on Afghanistan's war-scarred capital. At the time of her death, she was reporting a story on landmine removals facilitated by the non-governmental organization HALO Trust. The helicopter was owned by Sayed Jafar Naderi, governor of the northern Baghlan province and leader of the former Communist Ismaili militia; he is considered to be one of the world's most dangerous warlords.

== Personal life ==
Herbaugh kept her personal life private from family, friends, and colleagues. After her death, many learned she had one daughter, who lived with Herbaugh's parents in a rural town in Southeast Colorado. Herbaugh's daughter, the writer and journalist Tracee Herbaugh, wrote a Washington Post essay in 2014 in which she said her mother kept the father's identity a secret from everyone, and it remains so.
