= Robert C. Stanley =

American artist (1918–1996)

Robert Carter Stanley Jr. (March 28, 1918 – August 12, 1996) was an American artist famous for his works on paperback novel covers. He was born in Wichita, Kansas, and died in Big Pine Key, Florida.

As a realist artist, together with Gerald Gregg, he was one of the most two prolific paperback book cover artists employed by the Dell Publishing Company for whom Stanley worked from 1950 to 1959. Stanley also worked for other important paperback book publishers such as Bantam Books and Signet Books and also worked as an artist for cover or interior artwork for magazines such as Adventure, Argosy, Redbook, Street & Smith's Western Story Magazine and The Saturday Evening Post.

== Books ==
- Design Literacy: Understanding Graphic Design, Heller, Steven, 2nd Edition, Skyhorse Publishing Inc., Allworth Press, New York, NY, 2004.
- Paperbacks, U.S.A.: A Graphic History, 1939-1959. Schreuders, Piet E., Blue Dolphin Enterprises-Distributed by Pacific Comics Distributors, San Diego, California, 1981.
- The Book of Paperbacks: A Visual History Of The Paperback. Schreuders, Piet E., Virgin Books, London, 1981.
