= Gerald Gregg =

American artist

Gerald Gregg (January 25, 1907 – April 1, 1985) was an American artist famous for his works on paperback novel covers. He was born in Lamar, Colorado and lived in Racine, Wisconsin, where he died.

Together with Robert C. Stanley, he was one of the most two prolific paperback book cover artists employed by the Dell Publishing Company for whom Gregg worked from 1943 to 1950. He also worked for Wisconsin based Western Printing and Lithographing Company and drew comic strips and the back covers of their Little Golden Books.

Gregg prepared almost all his cover work by airbrush, had a style which was a combination of graphic design and stylized realism and his covers were almost similar to film noir of the period.

== Books ==
- Design Literacy: Understanding Graphic Design, Heller, Steven, 2nd Edition, Skyhorse Publishing Inc., Allworth Press, New York, NY, 2004.
- Paperbacks, U.S.A.: A Graphic History, 1939-1959. Schreuders, Piet E., Blue Dolphin Enterprises-Distributed by Pacific Comics Distributors, San Diego, California, 1981.
- The Book of Paperbacks: A Visual History Of The Paperback. Schreuders, Piet E., Virgin Books, London, 1981
