= Cañon City Daily Record =

Newspaper published in Cañon City, Colorado

- Type: Daily newspaper
- Owner: MediaNews Group
- Founder: Dr. Isaac E. Thayer
- Publisher: Prairie Mountain Publishing
- Editor: Michael Alcala
- Founded: 1875 (as the Cañon City Avalanche)
- Language: English
- Headquarters: Cañon City, Colorado
- ISSN: 3066-0076
- OCLC number: 1473841038
- Website: canoncitydailyrecord.com

Cañon City Daily Record is a daily newspaper published in Cañon City, Colorado. It is owned by Prairie Mountain Publishing, a subsidiary of MediaNews Group.

== History ==
On February 18, 1875, Dr. Isaac E. Thayer published the first edition of the Cañon City Avalanche. That May, Frank P. Warner, formerly of the Cañon City Times, acquired an interest in the business. On June 19, 1875, Thayer died. His widow then sold out to Warner. In April 1878, Saxe Cramer bought the Avalanche, and renamed it to the Fremont County Record. In 1879, H.T. Blake bought the paper from Cramer.

Blake suspended the Record for six months after reaching an agreement with a newly started daily, believing both papers could no survive simultaneously. Once the deal lapsed, the Record relaunched in August 1882. A month later the previous owner Cramer died at age 32. In April 1883, Judge Wilbur B. Felton became a co-owner and editor. At that time the paper was renamed to the Cañon City Record.

In 1892, Arthur R. Frisbie bought the Record. In July 1895, Frisbie sold the paper to Guy U. Hardy, who succeeded him as editor. In February 1903, Frisbie died. In 1906, Hardy expanded the paper from a weekly into a daily. He would go on to serve as president of the Colorado Press Association, president of the National Editorial Association and as a U.S. representative for Colorado. In 1947, Hardy died at age 75. His estate turned the Record over to his son, Donald "Don" Hardy, who headed the state press association for two decades and published the paper until his death in 1966 at age 54. His son David Hardy thrn took over as publisher and in 1969 discontinued the weekly edition.

In 1978, Edward L. and Ruth Lehman, owners of the Longmont Times-Call and the Loveland Reporter-Herald, acquired the Record from the Hardy family after 84 years of ownership. In 2011, Prairie Mountain Publishing acquired the paper along with its owner, Lehman Communications Corp. In June 2024, the Record announced it would switch from carrier to postal delivery.
