= CU Independent =

University of Colorado Boulder publication

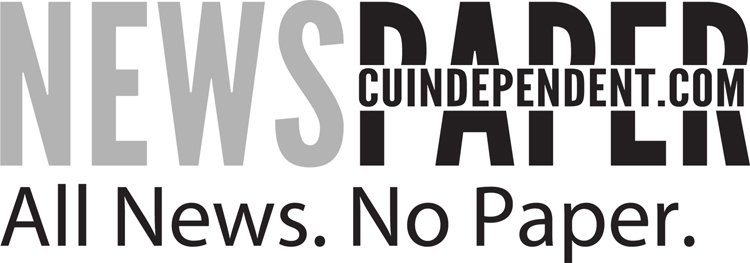
- Type: Student news website
- Founder: Mal Deans
- Founded: 1978
- Language: English
- Headquarters: 1511 University Ave. Room 206b, 478 UCB; Boulder, CO 80309-0478; United States
- Website: cuindependent.org

The CU Independent is the student-run news publication for the University of Colorado Boulder. It has been digital-only since 2006, when it became one of the first major college newspapers to drop its print edition.

== History ==
The paper was founded in 1978 as the Working Press but soon adopted the name Campus Press. It was launched by Mal Deans, a CU journalism instructor, to serve as a student-run newspaper after the Colorado Daily left campus and became a community newspaper.

The Campus Press became an online-only publication in August 2006, years ahead of most college newspapers. The tagline on the website was changed from "CU's only independent student voice" to "CU's only student voice."

The publication's name was changed to the CU Independent in August 2008 after it split from the journalism school's curriculum in the wake of a controversy over a student journalist's racially charged column.

In December 2019, the university's media college, which had been providing space and retaining staff pay, announced it will defund the CU Independent in favor of a faculty-led media enterprise. Staff of the CU Independent said they would continue to maintain the website and publish content under a new funding model separate from the college.

In 2024, the CU Independent changed its website's domain from cuindependent.com to cuindependent.org. The former cuindependent.com domain was later acquired by a third party and relaunched as a website that reused the newspaper's name. The new website falsely claims continuity with the student publication, and publishes low-quality "AI slop" articles that appear to be generated by artificial intelligence.

== Awards ==
In 2016 and 2019, the CU Independent won an Online Pacemaker Award presented by the Associated Collegiate Press. It has also won several regional awards from the Society of Professional Journalists including Best Independent Online Student Publication in 2014, 2015, 2016, and 2018.
