= Julesburg Advocate =

- Type: Weekly newspaper
- Format: Broadsheet
- Owner(s): Prairie Mountain Publishing (MediaNews Group)
- Publisher: Vickie Sandlin
- Language: English
- Headquarters: 114 West First Street; Julesburg, CO 80737; United States
- Website: julesburgadvocate.com

The Julesburg Advocate is a weekly newspaper in Julesburg, Colorado, published by Prairie Mountain Publishing, a unit of MediaNews Group.
