= Lake County Record-Bee =

- Type: Daily newspaper
- Owner: MediaNews Group
- Founder(s): J.B. Baccus, Jr.,
- Founded: 1873 (as Lake County Bee)
- Language: English
- City: Lakeport, California
- ISSN: 0746-4304
- OCLC number: 10036834
- Website: record-bee.com

The Lake County Record-Bee is a newspaper in the town of Lakeport, California.

== History ==
In 1872, J.B. Baccus, Jr., founded The Cloverdale Bee in Cloverdale, California. A year later he moved his equipment to Lakeport and relaunched his paper as the Lake County Bee. The business had several other proprietors in the following years and eventually came to be owned by A.C. Jackson.

In 1875, A.A.R. Utting, who previously owned the Napa Reporter, established the Lake Democrat. His health failed and he sold it in 1879 to John R. Cook, who a year later merged the business with Jackson's to form the Lakeport Bee-Democrat, which the two operated together. A fire destroyed the paper's office in 1883 and Jackson retired a few months later. The name was then changed to the Lakeport Democrat.

In 1921, Dr. W.R. Prather bought the paper, by then renamed back to the Bee, from G.E. Nichols. It was then managed by his son-in-law William "Bill" Bolce. In 1925, Sidney Roche and E.J. Moore founded the Lakeport Record in Upper Lake. The two soon acquired the Clear Lake Press at Lakeport, which ceased following a fire in the town. In 1926, they replaced it with a new paper called The Lakeport Press. The Press and Record were later consolidated to form the Lakeport Press-Record.

Bolce operated the Bee for almost 20 years until selling in 1940 it to Moore. In 1956, Roland R. Johnsrud became the new owner and he consolidated the Bee and the Press-Record in 1961 to form the Lake County Record-Bee. At the time the Press and Record had a circulation of 1,300 and the Bee had 1,600. The editorial team consisted of three who wrote for both papers. In 1981, the Times Publishing Company, owner of the Erie Times-News, bought the paper from Johnsrud. In 2001, the Record-Bee came under the ownership of MediaNews Group. At that time the paper had 7,300 subscribers.
