= Akron News-Reporter =

- Type: Weekly newspaper
- Format: Broadsheet
- Owner: Prairie Mountain Publishing (MediaNews Group) (Digital First Media)
- Publisher: Iva Kay Horner
- Staff writers: JoAnne Busing and Holly Peterson
- Founded: 1910
- Language: English
- Headquarters: 69 Main Ave; Akron, CO 80720; United States
- Circulation: 2,000
- Website: akronnewsreporter.com

The Akron News-Reporter is a weekly newspaper published in Akron, Colorado, by Prairie Mountain Publishing (Boulder, Colo.), a subsidiary of MediaNews Group (Denver, Colo.) itself a subsidiary of Digital First Media (New York City). It primarily serves the Town of Akron, the Town of Otis, and Washington County, in the State of Colorado, United States of America. The newspaper is published every Wednesday with a current circulation of about 2000.

== History ==
=== Early Akron Newspapers ===
About two years before the Town of Akron was incorporated as a statutory town (September 22, 1887), its first newspaper, the Akron Pioneer Press, began publication on November 1, 1885, and was published continuously for 38 years. It is partially digitized (earliest, Dec. 7, 1888) and is available for viewing online at the Colorado Historical Newspapers Collection.

The following table summarizes the early newspapers of Akron.

Start date	End date	Name of Newspaper	Years in Operation
11/1/1885	11/9/1923	Akron Pioneer Press	38.0
1886	1887	Colorado Beetle	1
1886	1889	Akron Herald	3
1886	1892	Akron Star	6
1888	1889	Akron Tribune	1
1888	1889	Washington County Democrat	1
1893	1896	Washington County Republican	4
1893	1895	Akron Advance	2
9/30/1897	5/24/1912	Washington County Leader	14.6
10/13/1910	2/28/1929	Akron News	18.4
7/1/1916	2/28/1929	Akron Reporter	12.7
3/7/1929	Present	Akron News-Reporter	80

=== Progenitors of The Akron News-Reporter ===
==== Akron News/Semi-Weekly News Ownership ====
The original newspaper began publication on October 13, 1910, as the Akron News. The News went through several changes of ownership through February 1929 as summarized in the table below.

Owner	Editor(s)	Beginning Date
F.C. Pinch, founder	F.C. Pinch	10/13/1910
F.W. McIntyre	F.W. McIntyre	8/14/1911
Isaac Pelton	I. Pelton, F.T. Hawks, T.A. Erb	May 1912
Isaac Pelton	D.C. Thomas	Dec 1916
Isaac Pelton	D.C. Thomas, John S. Evans	Dec 1917
Isaac Pelton	John S. Evans	Nov 1918
Charles M Cockrum	C.M. Cockrum, Worth Miller	Apr 1923
Worth Miller (Note: When Worth Miller bought the News from Cockrum he began publishing it on a semi-weekly basis so renamed the newspaper the Akron Semi-Weekly News)	Worth Miller	1928
R.B. Cooley	R.B. Cooley & C.L. Miller-Cooley	2/28/1929

==== Akron Reporter Ownership ====
Another, rival newspaper, The Akron Reporter, began publication on July 1, 1916. It, too, went through several changes in ownership until February, 1929, though fewer than the News. The changes are summarized in the following table.

Owner(s)	Editor(s)	Beginning Date
F.C. and R.M. Wester, founders	F.C. and R.M. Wester	7/1/1916
Robert A. Shook	Presley Pool	Jan 1922
Presley Pool	Presley Pool	(Note: It is unclear when Pool purchased the Reporter from Shook)
Steen M. Johnson	S.M. Johnson	Summer 1927
R.B. Cooley	R.B. Cooley & C.L. Miller-Cooley	2/28/1929

=== The Akron News-Reporter ===
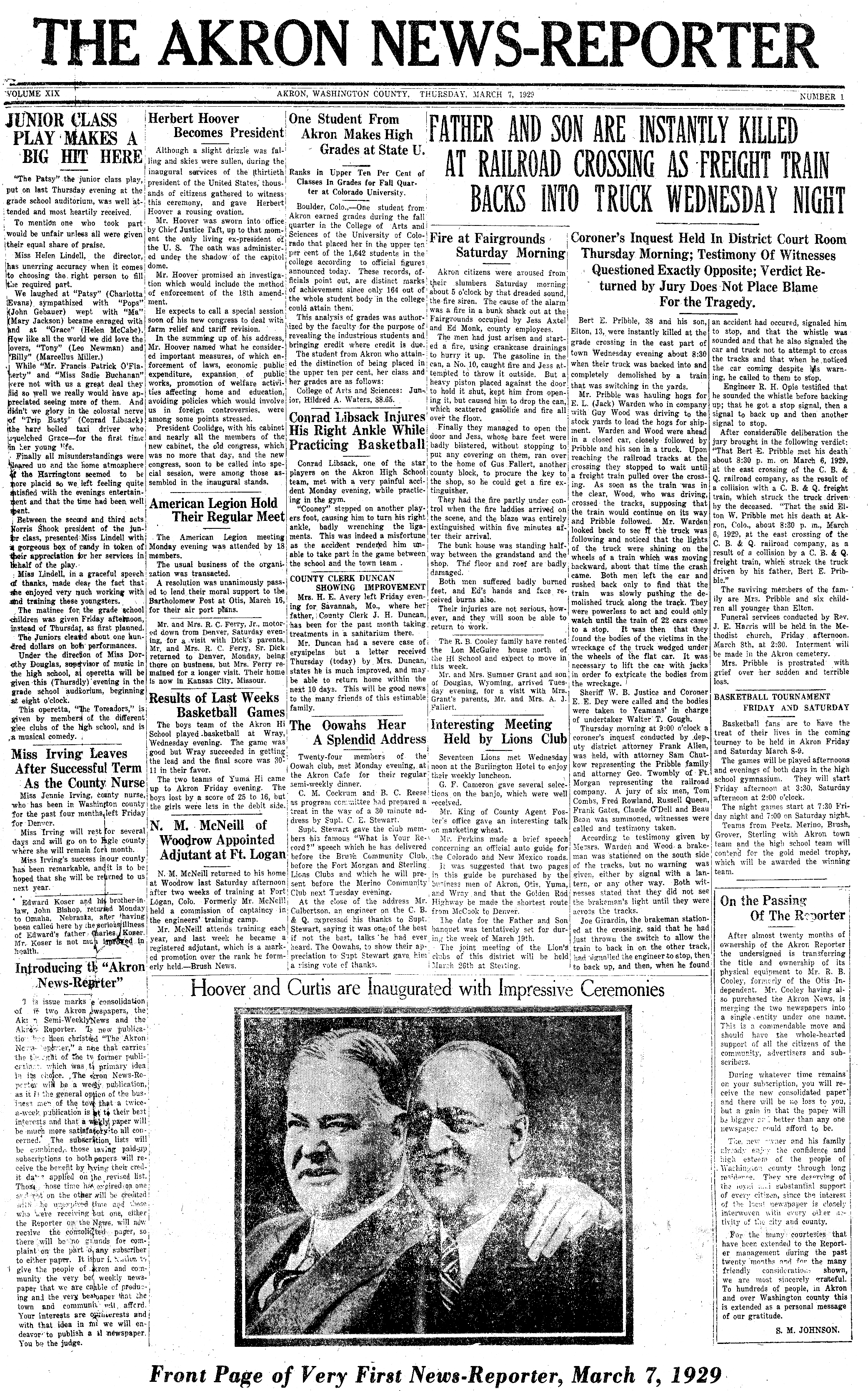

On February 28, 1929, Robert B. Cooley merged the Akron Semi-Weekly News and the Akron Reporter. The first issue of the combined papers, the Akron News-Reporter, was published on March 7, 1929. On the front page was news of Herbert Hoover's inauguration and a four-column photo of the new President and Vice President Charles Curtis.

There was a small notice in the lower right corner:

On the Passing Of The Reporter

After almost twenty months of ownership of the Akron Reporter the undersigned is transferring the title and ownership of its physical equipment to Mr. R.B. Cooley, formerly of the Otis Independent. Mr. Cooley, having purchased the Akron News, is merging the two newspapers into a single entity under one name. This is a commendable move and should have the whole-hearted support of all the citizens of the community, advertisers and subscribers. —S.M. Johnson

And in the lower left corner the News-Reporter was introduced:

This issue marks a consolidation of two Akron newspapers, the Akron Semi-Weekly News and the Akron Reporter. The new publication has been christened the Akron News-Reporter, a name that carries the thought of the two former publications, which was the primary idea in its choice. The Akron News-Reporter will be a weekly, as it is the general opinion of the businessmen of the town that a twice-weekly is not to their best interest and that a weekly publication will be much more satisfactory to all concerned. The subscription lists will be combined, those having paid-up subscriptions to both papers will receive the benefit by having their credit applied on the revised list. Those whose time has [not] expired on one paper or the other will be credited with the unexpired time, and those who were receiving but one will now receive the consolidated paper, so there will be no grounds for complaint of any subscriber to either paper. It is our intention to give the people of Akron and community the very best weekly newspaper that we are capable of producing and the very best newspaper that the town and community can afford. Your interests are our interests and with that idea in mind we will endeavor to publish a real newspaper. You be the judge.

The News-Reporter introduction was not signed.

==== Cooley Sons Carry On ====
The News-Reporter was owned and published by R.B. Cooley and his wife C.L. Miller-Cooley until 1955 when they relinquished control to their son C. Coyne Cooley and nephew Merton Beth Cooley, both of whom had been active in its operation since its inception. They operated the newspaper under an oral partnership until they reduced it to a written partnership on September 20, 1977, dba The Akron News-Reporter.

==== Equipment through the 50s and 60s ====
The News-Reporter had the following newspaper and job printing equipment through the two decades of the 1950s and 1960s.

===== Type Casting =====
- Linotype machine
- Intertype Machine

===== Newspaper Printing Press =====
- Miehle hand-fed flatbed cylinder press
- Newspaper folding machine

===== Letterpresses =====
The Akron News-Reporter supplemented its newspaper business with job printing (letterheads, envelopes, bills, posters, announcements, and other miscellaneous small-piece printing work).

- Chandler & Price Hand Fed Platen Press
- Kluge Automatic-Feed Platen Job Press
- Lee Hand-fed Flatbed Cylinder Press

==== The End of an Era ====
Coyne and Beth had operated the News-Reporter for 24 years when on July 2, 1979, they sold the newspaper to Danny L. Reneau and C. Bryce Wilkins dba Akron Publishing Co., thus ending the 67-year Cooley Newspaper Dynasty in Eastern Colorado.

==== Transfers of Ownership after the Cooley Era ====
Reneau and Wilkins sold the News-Reporter in May 1989 to American Publishing Company, a subsidiary of Hollinger Corporation of Toronto, Ontario. In 1990, Karen Ashley was named editor, Bonnie Miller, general manager, and Anita Kraich, ad director.

Seven years later on April 4, 1996, the News-Reporter and other weekly newspapers of American Publishing were sold to MediaNews Group. Editor Karen Ashley wrote

It's a part of the human condition that we resist change. We become comfortable with the established routine, the familiar rut. Now, however, we at the Akron News-Reporter are announcing a new change in ownership....We received official notification [our newspaper] and other Colorado newspapers owned by American Publishing have been sold to NewsMedia (sic) of Denver...

MediaNews, in turn, formed a subsidiary, the Eastern Colorado Publishing Co, comprising the Akron News-Reporter and several other Eastern Colorado newspapers. According to SEC filings in 2002 the subsidiary comprised the following newspapers:

Newspaper	Colo. Location
Fort Morgan Times	Fort Morgan
Journal-Advocate	Sterling
Lamar Daily News	Lamar
Akron News Reporter	Akron
Brush News-Tribune	Brush
Julesburg Advocate	Julesburg
Burlington Record	Burlington
Estes Park Trail Gazette	Estes Park

On February 2, 2006, the E. W. Scripps Company and MediaNews Group Inc. formed a partnership to operate both companies’ newspapers throughout the USA. The newspapers of MediaNews' Eastern Colorado Publishing Co. were merged with those operated by Scripps in eastern Colorado, the Boulder Daily Camera, the Colorado Daily, and the Broomfield Enterprise, to form a new subsidiary, the Prairie Mountain Publishing Company with headquarters in Boulder, Colorado. Scripps left the partnership in 2009.

=== The Cooley Newspaper Family ===
==== Twin Brothers Become Newspapermen ====
Robert Berton Cooley (Bert) and his twin brother Herbert Merton (Mert) were born in McGregor, Iowa, October 15, 1875. About the turn of the 20th century the brothers moved to Nebraska. Bert was married to Carrie Louella Miller (Lou) in 1902 in Plainview, Nebr. This union produced three sons, Orville Dale, Clifford Coyne, and Robert Miller. Mert was married to Elizabeth Holliday in Knox County Nebraska and to this union two sons were born, Ronald Delos and Merton Beth.

Herbert Merton was the first twin to get into the newspaper business when in 1906 he formed a partnership with a Mr Lawrence to operate the Crofton (Nebraska) Progress.

About the same time the first edition of a competing newspaper, the Crofton Journal was published 7 Jun 1906 with editors and publishers Peterson & Alwine. It changed hands as follows: 1907, Robinson; 1908, Needham & McCoy.

On 7 Dec 1911 the Crofton Journal merged with the Crofton Progress. It is unclear whom the owner(s) of the merged newspaper were at this point but by 1913 Herbert Merton Cooley had become sole proprietor purchasing it from J.B. McCoy.

Bert and Lou taught school in Plainview, Nebraska, until 1910 when they migrated westward to prove up on a homestead northwest of Flagler, Colorado. About two years later on January 12, 1912 Bert founded the Otis Independent at Otis, Colorado.

In a tragic automobile accident in 1914, Mert was drowned in the Missouri River after a car in which he was a passenger drove off a pontoon bridge near Yankton, South Dakota. Bert gave up the Otis Independent and moved the family back to Crofton to assume control of his brother's newspaper and the parenting of his two sons, Ronald and Beth. But in 1916, because of a worsening allergy condition, Bert sold the Journal and returned to Colorado to resume operation of the Otis Independent, this time with two more "sons" in tow.

Bert continued to operate the Independent until the fall of 1928 when, in a trade, he swapped the Otis Independent for ownership in the Monte Vista Tribune, Monte Vista, Colorado, now the Monte Vista Journal. Within a few months, Bert disposed of the Tribune, went to Akron, Colo., where he bought the Akron Semi-Weekly News and the Akron Reporter combining the two papers on February 28, 1929, into the Akron News-Reporter.

==== A Cooley Newspaper Dynasty Forms ====
For twenty five years beginning in 1912 the sons had worked off and on at their father's newspaper, each deciding to become a newspaperman at one time or another.

Dale started helping as a printer's devil when he was just a youngster, and continued to work with his dad through high school and college, where he earned a degree in journalism at the University of Denver. Although he had initially wanted to become a newspaperman, he, instead, took a teaching job at Otis High School (Note: Current Otis Jr/Sr High School home page) and remained there until 1936 when he returned to Akron to work at the Akron News-Reporter.

Ronald, in his early years, helped his father, Mert, twin brother of Bert, at the Crofton Journal. When Mert met his untimely death, Ronald continued to help his uncle Bert when he came to Crofton to run his brother's newspaper. The family moved back to Colorado in 1916 where Ronald joined Dale and his father at the Otis Independent. He went on to receive a degree in journalism at the University of Colorado, afterwards returning to Otis to work at the Independent and, later, in Akron at the News-Reporter.

Beth, born in Crofton about two years after Ronald, also grew up in the newspaper business and was helping his dad when he was only four years old folding newspapers. When Mert was killed, Beth continued to help at the Crofton Journal when his uncle Bert assumed the reins. Beth worked with his uncle continuously from Crofton in 1914 to Otis to Akron until Bert retired in 1956.

Coyne was literally born into the newspaper business in a small living space above the Otis Independent print shop. From Visions, Cooleys, and Graves:

Starting his newspaper career by sweeping out the Independent office while he was in grade school, Coyne moved up to printer's devil when he was in seventh grade [about 1919], and to learning the operation of "the great old machine, the Linotype", when he was a high school freshman [about 1920]. By the time he graduated high school [sic] he could do everything necessary to produce a weekly newspaper: Write the stories, set the type, sell the ads, make up the page forms and put them on the press, run the press and kill out after the last run." His greatest thrill was the day his father let him start covering high school sports. He decided, without question, to be a newspaperman.

Coyne received a degree in journalism from the University of Colorado in 1936 and within two weeks he was back at it at the News-Reporter.

All in all, Coyne was the editor of the News-Reporter for 41 years (1936 to 1977).

Robert Cooley (Bob), the youngest of the three sons of R.B., helped in his father's newspaper during his younger years in Akron. He attended the University of Colorado where he graduated in 1937 with a degree in journalism. After World War II he went into the newspaper business outside of Colorado (Mountain Home, Idaho). In a few years, because of ill health, he sold the newspaper and moved to the drier climate of Arizona where he taught journalism in Arizona State University. Later, after a brief stint at Reedley College in California, he went to Flagstaff, Arizona, where he accepted the position of Chairman of the Journalism Department and Director of Public Information at Northern Arizona University. He held this position at NAU until his retirement in 1977.

==== Newspapers Spawned ====
In 1937, with five sons working at the same small newspaper in Akron, R.B. Cooley decided to make some adjustments. The two older sons, Dale and Ronald, were sent to Limon, Colorado, to publish the Eastern Colorado Leader which R.B. had just acquired. It was later combined with the Genoa Sentinel, Genoa, Colorado, to form the Limon Leader which they published until their retirement on June 1, 1972.

The youngest son, Robert M. Cooley who had married an Idaho girl, Eleanor Newcomb, moved to her home state where he became editor and later owner of the Mountain Home News, Mountain Home, Idaho. Because of a worsening health condition he sold the newspaper 12 years later and moved to Arizona.

Coyne and Beth remained at the News-Reporter eventually gaining full control of the newspaper in 1956. They continued its operation until 1977 when they sold it to the American Publishing.

The Cooley newspaper dynasty in Colorado was broken after 67 years with all but one of the third-generation Cooleys taking up non-newspaper occupations. The exception is James R. Cooley, son of Ronald D. Cooley, who, along with his wife, Maria H., currently publishes the Oxford Standard, Oxford, Nebraska
