= Evergreen Newspapers =

Evergreen Newspapers Inc is a publisher of three weekly newspapers and a direct mail shopper in Evergreen, Colorado. It is owned by Landmark Community Newspapers, a subsidiary of Landmark Communications.

Current publications include:

- The Canyon Courier, serving Bailey, Conifer, Evergreen, Genesee, Kittredge, Lookout Mountain, and Morrison;
- Clear Creek Courant, serving Idaho Springs, Georgetown, and Floyd Hill along the I-70 corridor;
- Columbine Courier, serving areas of Littleton, Ken Caryl, Columbine, Grant Ranch, and southwestern Jefferson County; and
- the 285 Hustler, a direct mail shopper.

== History ==
The Courier began in 1955 as Smoke Signals, a monthly bulletin published by the Indian Hills Fire Department. The paper was purchased in 1958 to begin weekly publication as the Canyon Courier.

In 1977, Evergreen Newspapers began publishing The High Timber Times, which served Morrison, Conifer, Pine, Bailey, and the 285 corridor; it merged with the Canyon Courier in 2016. The Clear Creek Courant began publication in 1973; the Columbine Courier, in 1991.
