= Longmont Times-Call =

Newspaper published in Longmont, Colorado

- Type: Daily newspaper
- Owner: Prairie Mountain Publishing
- Founder: Elmer F. Beckwith
- Founded: 1871; 155 years ago (as the Colorado Press)
- Language: English
- City: Longmont, Colorado
- Country: United States
- Website: timescall.com

The Longmont Daily Times-Call is a daily newspaper published in Longmont, Colorado, United States. It carries local, regional, national and world news and republishes most of its stories from sister publications owned by its parent company, MediaNews Group.

== History ==
In 1871, Elmer F. Beckwith published the first edition of the Colorado Press in Longmont. At that time Beckwith was a law student who decided to launch the town's first newspaper instead of taking the bar exam. In 1872, Beckwith sold the paper to D.G. Scouten. Scouten called it quits after six months and Beckwith resumed ownership.

In 1879, the paper's office was destroyed in a fire. Beckwith briefly suspended the Press and resumed publication three months later. In 1887, Rev. V.P. Wilson acquired the paper, and a year later relocated it to Denver to be relaunched as the Denver Press. In response, Beckwith and George B. McFadden launched a new paper in town. The Longmont Times first published on March 31, 1888, with Beckwith as editor and McFadden as proprietor. Lowell S. Smith took charge shortly after.

In 1890, Ross F. DeArmond became editor and proprietor, but left after two years. In 1892, D.W. Working joined the Smith bros. as co-owner and editor. In 1893, Working left, and Beckwith returned as editor. That December, the Times was expanded from a weekly to daily. At some point Beckwith bought out L.S. Smith and his father Dr. Alec Smith.

In 1898, William Forgey founded the Longmont Call. George W. Johnson assumed management a few months later. In 1906, the Call expanded from a weekly into a daily. In 1919, Ray Lanyon bought the Daily Times from the Beckwiths. In 1924, Johnson was assaulted by the local head of the Ku Klux Klan. In February 1925, Johnson was sued for libel by a chiropractor, which was believed to have been done on behalf of the KKK upset with Johnson's alleged anti-Klan attitude.

In July 1925, Lanyon sold a part interest in the Daily Times to Leo A. Noble and Otis Moore. In September 1929, Johnson died. In November 1929, Daily Times founder E.F. Beckwith died. In 1930, Dr. J.A. Matlack acquired the Daily Call from the Johnson family. In 1931, the Times and the Call merged to form the Longmont Times-Call, with Lanyon and Matlack being co-owners. In 1938, Matlack died from a heart attack at age 63.

In 1957, lawyer Edward Lehman acquired the paper from Lanyon. In 1961, Lanyon, who's life achievements include serving as the town's mayor, died at age 79. In 1967, the Lehmans merged their business with the publisher of the Loveland Daily Reporter-Herald. In 1978, Lehman acquired the Cañon City Daily Record. In 2011, Prairie Mountain Publishing acquired the paper along with its owner, Lehman Communications Corp. In 2017 the paper closed its offices and moving forward staff would work out of the office of the Boulder Daily Camera.

In 2019, Corey Hutchins in the Columbia Journalism Review stated that the owner of the Times-Call, Alden Global Capital, "is nationally known for gutting newsrooms," and that the paper has slimmed down over the years."
