= Reporter-Herald =

Daily newspaper in Berthoud, Colorado, US

- Type: Daily newspaper
- Owner: Prairie Mountain Publishing
- Founder: G.N. Udell
- Founded: 1880
- Language: English
- Headquarters: Berthoud, Colorado
- Website: reporterherald.com

The Loveland Reporter-Herald is a daily newspaper published in Berthoud, Colorado. It is owned by Prairie Mountain Publishing, a subsidiary of MediaNews Group.

== History ==
In August 1880, G.N. Udell published the first edition of the Loveland Reporter. That October, Frank A. McClelland acquired the paper. It was then bought by George W. Bailey and John Smart in July 1881, Messrs. Statler & Hanna with Sam F. McCreery as editor in May 1883, John B. Bruner and Charles F. Coleman in August 1882,

Bruner died in March 1885, and his widow sold the paper to J.A. Little and Rev. A.E. Seibert. In January 1886, Seibert sold out to J.E. Bird, and a few weeks later McClelland reacquired the Reporter. In January 1889, Frank S. Smith bought the Reporter from McClelland. In December 1890, M.L. Thorndyke bought a half-interest. In July 1891, Smith retired from the Reporter in order to devote his full attention to his other paper, the Fort Collins Express.

In January 1905, Frank McMeekin bought the Reporter from Thorndyke. In July 1906, Udell, the Reporter's founder, died. In December 1906, George A. Collett founded a rival paper called the Loveland Herald. In December 1908, McKeekin acquired the Loveland Register and absorbed it into the Reporter. In February 1909, R.O. Knapp and Roy Shirley purchased the Reporter. In August 1910, Mark A. Ellison assumed control of the Herald, and Collett sold out a year later. In February 1911, Mason E. Knapp joined his brother at the Reporter.

In July 1913, I.G. Stafford bought the Reporter from the Knapp brothers and C.A. Carleton. In June 1915, A.W. Barnes bought the Reporter from Stafford. In September 1920, the Reporter was expanded into a daily. In July 1922, Barnes bought the Herald from Ellison and Bob Branson and merged the two to form the Loveland Reporter-Herald. That August, Barnes sold the paper to R. Welden Ball and Robert L. Yetter.

After 22 years, the two sold the Herald-Reporter in 1944 to Harley E. Holden. In 1959, H.E. Holden sold a half interest in the paper to Harlow E. Tibbets so he could retire, partly due to suffering a heart attack two years prior. In 1962, Tibbets died at age 62, and his widow sold his share to Holden's son, John H. Holden. In 1963, H.E. Holden died unexpectedly at age 68.

In 1967, J.E. Holden formed a joint venture with Edward L. Lehman, owner of the Longmont Times-Call, and the two co-owned both papers. In 1969, J.E. Holden retired from the business and Lehman succeeded him as publisher. In 1978, Lehman acquired the Cañon City Daily Record. In 2011, Prairie Mountain Publishing acquired the paper along with its owner, Lehman Communications Corp.

== Office ==
The offices were held in 201 E. Fifth St., Loveland, Colorado from 1993 to 2017. The paper is as of 2017 based out of neighboring Berthoud, Colorado. From 1956 to 1993, the Reporter-Herald offices were across Fifth Street in what became the Community Health Center. In all, the Reporter-Herald had been in downtown Loveland for more than 100 years, in various locations.
