= The Denver North Star =

Local monthly newspaper in Denver, Colorado

- Your Guide to Community, Politics, Arts and Culture in North Denver
- Type: Monthly Newspaper
- Format: Print and Digital
- Publisher: David Sabados
- Founded: September 7, 2019
- Language: English
- Headquarters: Denver, Colorado
- Country: United States
- Circulation: 33,000
- Website: denvernorthstar.com
- Free online archives: Past issues

The Denver North Star is a monthly newspaper and website that has been published in the Northwest Denver, Colorado, area starting in October 2019. The North Star has a hyperlocal focus on issues like parks and recreation, elections, education, dining, zoning, and development.

== History ==
There has been tumult in the Denver print media ecosystem over the preceding decade. Examples include the Rocky Mountain News shutting down in 2009, layoffs and reductions at The Denver Post by Digital First Media, and the 2017 closure of the North Denver Tribune (the local newspaper of record for the area). The North Star emerged to fill a void left by the now-defunct North Denver Tribune, which served the area for 83 years.

North Star founders and publishers, David Sabados and Sabrina D'Agosta, were both candidates for Denver's District 1 City Council seat in 2019. Though neither won the election, both saw a need for local journalism covering issues affecting the community. D'Agosta left the paper in early 2020. Sabados still serves as the paper's publisher and editor.

== Distribution ==
The North Star delivers door-to-door to homes and businesses, and is also made available through newspaper boxes around Northwest Denver. In particular, the newspaper targets neighborhoods west of I-25 from West Colfax Avenue North to Denver's border. This includes neighborhoods: Sloan's Lake, West Colfax, Jefferson Park, Highland, West Highland, Sunnyside, Berkeley, Regis, Inspiration Point, and Chaffee Park. Print editions of the paper are delivered free within the North Denver delivery area, for a subscription fee outside of it, or accessed on-line for free.
