= Estes Park Trail-Gazette =

Weekly newspaper in Estes Park, Colorado

- Type: Weekly newspaper
- Format: Broadsheet
- Owner: Prairie Mountain Publishing (MediaNews Group)
- Publisher: Jody Street
- Founded: 1912
- Headquarters: 1230 Big Thompson Ave; Estes Park, CO 80517; United States
- Website: eptrail.com

The Trail-Gazette is a weekly newspaper in Estes Park, Colorado. It is published by Prairie Mountain Publishing, a unit of MediaNews Group.

== History ==
The Estes Park Trail began as a seasonal weekly magazine catering to the tourists who flocked to the Rockies from June through September. John Y. Munson, a retired farmer who lived in Berthoud, Colorado (perhaps a summer resident of Estes Park), was the first publisher (U.S. census, Berthoud, Larimer Co, Colorado, 1910, household 188). In 1912, he made suggestions for improvements such as village beautification, waste cans on Elkhorn Avenue and daily street cleaning (J.Y. Munson, "Editorial," Estes Park Trail vol. 1 no. 13, p. 1). Those suggestions branded the publication as a community newspaper from its inception.

By 1914, the Estes Park Trail had grown to 42 illustrated pages of travel articles, poetry, area news, columns about visitors, the occasional pithy editorial (often about the Business Men's Association), and advertisements. The Trail chronicled the early twentieth-century development of Estes Park, providing insights into early Colorado tourism and Rocky Mountain National Park.

In 1921, with the backing of businessmen who wanted a job printer in Estes Park, Arthur B. Harris became the editor and publisher of the Estes Park Trail, which was thereafter produced locally. He published the weekly paper from April into December, and remained the editor as late as 1930 (U.S. census, Estes Park, Larimer Co, Colorado, 1910, household 52).

Thus the early seasonal tourist magazine evolved into a year-round community newspaper which became today's Trail-Gazette.

Some issues of the Estes Park Trail for 1914-1924 are preserved in the digital collections of Colorado Historic Newspapers online.
