= Lamar Ledger =

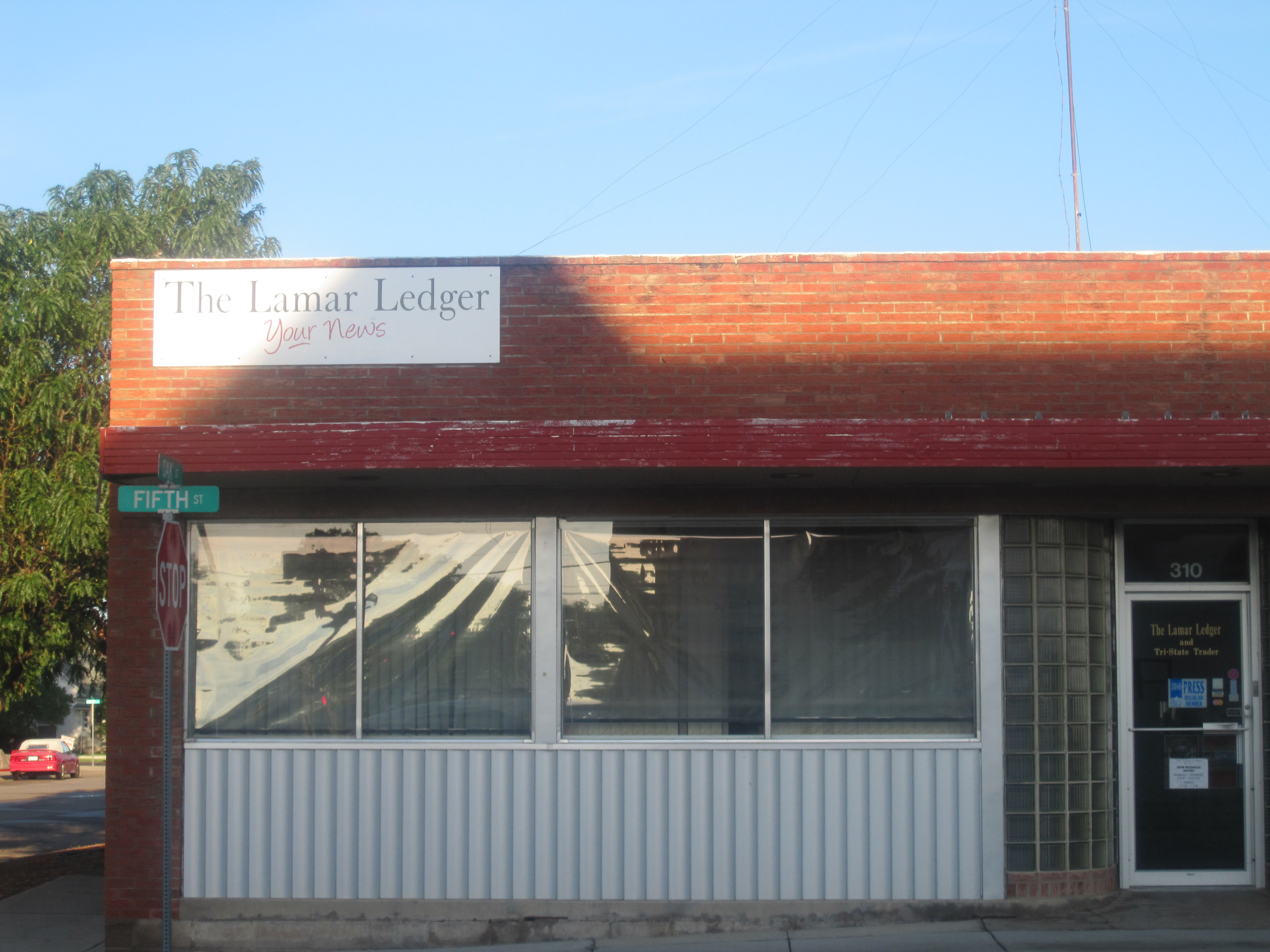
- Lamar Ledger newspaper office, Lamar, CO
- Type: Weekly newspaper
- Format: Broadsheet
- Owner(s): Digital First Media
- Founder(s): C. Frost Liggett
- Editor: Mike Bowen
- Founded: August 1907
- Language: English
- Ceased publication: July 25, 2024
- Headquarters: 222 South Main St. (P.O. Box 1217); Lamar, Colorado 81052; United States
- Website: lamarledger.com

The Lamar Ledger was a weekly newspaper in Lamar, Colorado from 1907 to 2024. It was published by Prairie Mountain Publishing, a division of Digital First Media.

== History ==
The Lamar Daily News was founded by C. Frost Liggett in August 1907. It was renamed to the Lamar Ledger in 2007.

In July 2024, the paper's publisher Prairie Mountain Publishing announced the Lamar Ledger will close due to declining advertising revenue and rising production costs. At the time, the paper was mailed out to 3,200 homes weekly for free.
