= Clear Creek Courant =

Newspaper in Idaho Springs, Colorado, US

- Type: Weekly newspaper
- Format: Broadsheet
- Owner: Colorado Trust for Local News
- Editor: Christopher Koeberl
- Founded: 1973
- Headquarters: Idaho Springs, Colorado
- Circulation: 1936
- Sister newspapers: The Canyon Courier
- Website: clearcreekcourant.com

The Clear Creek Courant is a weekly newspaper in Idaho Springs, Colorado, that also serves Georgetown and Floyd Hill along the I-70 corridor.

== History ==
The newspaper was founded in 1973 by Cary and Carol (Wilcox) Stiff, former reporters at The Denver Post

In May 2021, The Colorado Sun and nonprofit organization The National Trust for Local News became joint owners of Clear Creek Courant along with over a dozen more local newspapers previously owned by Evergreen Newspapers.

== Awards ==
The Clear Creek Courant is particularly notable for the number of awards it has received. It has been named the best weekly in the state by the Colorado Press Association, along with more than 50 other CPA accolades, for its news coverage, columns, editorials, and general excellence. Further, in 1997, the papers then-editors, Stiff and Wilcox, were awarded the Eugene Cervi Memorial Award, chosen by the International Society of Weekly Newspaper Editors.
