= The Canyon Courier =

Canyon Courier
- Type: Weekly newspaper
- Owner: Colorado Trust for Local News
- Publisher: Colorado Trust for Local News
- Editor: Jane Reuter
- Founded: 1955
- Language: English
- Headquarters: 27902 Meadow Dr., Ste. 200; Evergreen, CO 80439
- Circulation: 8,000
- Sister newspapers: Clear Creek Courant
- OCLC number: 22191902
- Website: canyoncourier.com

The Canyon Courier is a weekly newspaper published on Wednesdays by Evergreen Newspapers. The newspaper primarily serves the community of Evergreen, Colorado, 30 miles west of Denver, Colorado. The Courier was featured in the 1999 movie Double Jeopardy.

== History ==
The Courier began in 1955 as Smoke Signals, a monthly bulletin published by the Indian Hills Fire Department. The paper was purchased in 1958 to begin weekly publication as the Canyon Courier.

In October 2016, The High Timber Times, founded in 1977, was merged into the Courier. In May 2021, The Colorado Sun and nonprofit organization The National Trust for Local News became joint owners of The Canyon Courier along with over a dozen more local newspapers previously owned by Evergreen Newspapers.
