= BizWest =

American paper

- Type: Monthly
- Owner: BizWest Media
- Founder(s): Jeff Nuttall and Chris Wood
- Publisher: Jeff Nuttall and Chris Wood
- Editor: Chris Wood
- Managing editor: Lucas High
- Staff writers: 4
- Language: English
- City: Boulder, Colorado
- Country: United States
- ISSN: 2334-5721
- Website: bizwest.com

BizWest is a print and electronic business paper in Northern Colorado.

== History ==
In 2010, Brown Publishing Company, the owner of the newspapers Boulder County Business Report and Northern Colorado Business Report declared bankruptcy and, in September, sold them to Ohio Community Media. In February 2011, the publishers of the two papers formed BizWest Media to acquire their publications, the Wyoming Business Report, and ancillary other assets from Ohio Community Media. In March 2014, the Boulder County Business Report and Northern Colorado Business Report were merged into a biweekly printed paper called BizWest, with initial circulation of 9,000 to cover Boulder, Broomfield, Larimer and Weld counties, as well as the Denver-Boulder corridor.

In September 2016, BizWest reduced its print publication frequency to monthly and laid off four of its eighteen staff, including one writer. The company cited subscribers shifting to digital-only subscriptions and management's desire to focus on growth areas of the business as reasons for the changes.
