= Brush News-Tribune =

- Type: Weekly newspaper
- Format: Broadsheet
- Owner: Prairie Mountain Publishing (Digital First Media)
- Publisher: Brian Porter
- Founded: 1896
- Ceased publication: July 2024
- Language: English
- Headquarters: 230A Main Street; Fort Morgan, CO 80701; United States
- Website: brushnewstribune.com

The Brush News-Tribune was a weekly newspaper in Brush, Colorado. It was published by Prairie Mountain Publishing, which is owned by Digital First Media which is controlled by Alden Global Capital.

== History ==
The Brush News-Tribune was the successor to the Brush Tribune, which began publishing in 1896 and the Brush News, which began in early 1900s. They merged in 1941. In July 2024, Prairie Mountain Publishing closed the paper.
