= Colorado Daily =

Defunct American newspaper

- Type: Free daily newspaper
- Format: Tabloid
- Owner: MediaNews Group
- Publisher: Al Manzi
- Editor: Christy Fantz
- Founded: 1892 (as the Silver & Gold)
- Ceased publication: 17 September 2022
- Headquarters: 5450 Western Ave. Boulder, Colorado 80301; United States
- Website: coloradodaily.com

The Colorado Daily was a newspaper published in Boulder, Colorado, by Prairie Mountain Publishing Co. LLC, a unit of MediaNews Group. Its final issue was published on September 17, 2022. The Daily was operated out of the offices of Boulder's Daily Camera newspaper. Originally the student newspaper of the University of Colorado, the Daily became independent in 1970 and underwent several ownership changes since 2001, coming under the control of the Camera, its former competitor, when it was purchased by the E.W. Scripps Co. in 2005. The newspaper and its website, coloradodaily.com, continued to focus much of their coverage on the university.

First published on September 13, 1892, the Daily has been said to be the oldest free daily newspaper in the U.S. In 2000 and 2001, the newspaper won several national journalism awards for its investigative reporting.

== History 1892-1970 ==
The Daily was originally named The Silver and Gold and was the student newspaper of the University of Colorado from 1892-1970. It was renamed the Colorado Daily in 1953. In 1970, it was shut down by the CU board of regents, which had grown displeased with the newspaper's editorial positions, including its opposition to the war in Vietnam. The newspaper's staff transformed the Daily into an independent, off-campus operation supported by advertising revenue.

Under its new structure, the Daily continued to focus much of its coverage on the university as well as the city of Boulder, Boulder County, and state, national and international affairs. Distributed daily on weekdays as a free newspaper on the CU-Boulder campus and campuses in Denver, Aurora and Colorado Springs, as well as locations throughout Boulder County, it competed with the Camera for scoops, readership and advertising dollars until 2005.

== History 1970-1998 ==
The Daily took shape as an independent newspaper under the leadership of Tim Lange, who served as editor from 1970–75 and again from 1980 to 1986. Lange spearheaded coverage including original reporting from the civil war in Nicaragua, an investigation into the budding U.S. missile-defense program, and an exposé on a Federal Emergency Management Administration civil-defense plan for use in the event of a nuclear strike in U.S. cities including Boulder. "Articles like these induced Nation scribe Alexander Cockburn to declare the Daily the best leftist newspaper in the country," the Denver newspaper Westword wrote in a 2001 retrospective. The newspaper bolstered its anti-establishment reputation by publishing an "anti-Reagan issue" in 1984 and took left-leaning editorial positions as late as 2000, when it endorsed Green Party nominee Ralph Nader for president.

Lange was replaced as editor by Clint Talbott, who led the newspaper for 14 years until 1998. That year, a series of editorials by Talbott on the legal ordeal of a rape victim, who took her case to trial, earned the Daily a Pulitzer Prize nomination. The Pulitzer judges called Talbott's writing "powerful."

== Investigative awards 1999-2001 ==
Pamela White replaced Clint Talbott as editor in 1998. Setting out to return the Daily to its tradition of muckraking exemplified by Lange, she led the Daily to numerous prizes for investigative reporting.

The newspaper won several national awards for its reporting in 1999 on how University of Colorado President John Buechner arranged the hiring of a personal friend, Frances Raudenbush, to head a university-wide initiative. Learning that Raudenbush had been hired through a contract with the CU Foundation, a quasi-independent fund-raising arm of the university, the Daily requested records about her hiring and responsibilities from the university and the foundation but was told the records weren't public. The Daily sued the under the Colorado Open Records Act and gained access to more than 7,000 pages of documents, including Raudenbush's contract, as part of a settlement. The documents and additional reporting by the Daily showed that Raudenbush, who had no academic background, was paid a salary exceeding that of many university administrators and worked out of the president's office, where she spearheaded the "Total Learning Environment" initiative, an effort to re-brand the university and raise funds through corporate partnerships.

Throughout the Daily's months-long investigation, Buechner (pronounced BEAK-nur) refused to speak with Daily reporters about Raudenbush, the TLE, or anything else. Members of the university's elected board of regents downplayed the matter and accused the newspaper of shoddy journalism, with one calling the Daily a "supper-market tabloid" [sic]. At one meeting of the regents at the university's Denver campus, two Daily reporters were ejected by university police officers after confronting Buechner and asking him to comment on the matter. The rival Camera newspaper (then called the Daily Camera) published an editorial condemning the university's action, which also prompted the American Civil Liberties Union of Colorado to write a letter of concern to the school, questioning whether it had violated the reporters' First Amendment rights. The university said the reporters had disrupted the meeting, a contention the Daily denied.

After being repeatedly rebuffed, the Daily took the unusual step of publishing a front-page editorial on September 28, 1999, listing the questions it sought to ask Buechner. Among the questions was one asking him to clarify the nature of his relationship with Raudenbush. In another unconventional move, the Daily prodded Denver's daily newspapers, which had until then largely ignored the controversy, to join its cause. This led to the Rocky Mountain News publishing an editorial on October 11, 1999, in which it said the "public deserves an explanation" of the Raudenbush matter. Shortly after the Rocky's editorial, on October 13, 1999, Buechner announced he would resign, citing a lack of support from the regents. He denied that the resignation was tied to the Daily's investigation and never answered the newspaper's questions.

A critical state audit of the CU foundation later found that Buechner had also assisted in securing an $875,000 CU Foundation loan to help Richard Byyny, then chancellor of the CU-Boulder campus, buy a house from Raudenbush in 1997.

In 2000, the Daily's investigation was awarded the Scripps Howard Foundation's Roy W. Howard Award for public service reporting. "The effort embodies what public service by a newspaper is and what persistence it often requires," the judges said in announcing the award. Additional awards were given by the Education Writers Association and the National Newspaper Association. Investigative Reporters and Editors (IRE) named the Daily's investigation a finalist in its annual contest.

The Daily also won a special citation in 2001 from the Education Writers Association for its reporting on the University of Colorado Medical School's "dog labs," in which medical students killed dogs as part of their studies. The investigation showed the school had obtained its dogs from a controversial animal dealer and examined the ethical arguments surrounding the killing of dogs, as well as the university's expulsion of a medical student for aiding animal-rights activists who were protesting against the labs. The Daily's investigation prompted state lawmakers to debate the use of the dog labs, which were later shut down.

== Ownership and editorial changes since 2001 ==
The Colorado Daily was owned by Front Range Publishing, Inc., an employee-owned company, until 2001, when that company declared bankruptcy. The bankruptcy was triggered by the alleged embezzlement of more than $250,000 by its finance manager, who in 2003 pleaded guilty to a single count of falsifying an income-tax return. The bankrupt newspaper was purchased by Randy Miller, formerly of Lee Enterprises, who returned the paper to profitability. Upon taking ownership, Miller named himself publisher, sparking the departure of former editor-in-chief White. The newspaper had an estimated daily circulation of 23,000 copies at the time.

Miller told newsroom employees the newspaper would take a less confrontational approach to the university while focusing intensely on local affairs. The latter marked a shift from the newspaper's recent coverage of protests against free-market globalization including 1999's "Battle in Seattle" and the 2000 presidential campaign.

The increased emphasis on local affairs was exemplified by the Daily's edition the day after the September 11, 2001 attacks. Instead of featuring a photo of the burning World Trade Center towers on its front page, as most newspapers did, the Daily ran a picture of people donating blood at the local Red Cross branch. In the Colorado Daily's front-page photo the next day, the volunteers donating blood could be seen reading the rival newspaper's extra edition.

On September 26, 2005, Miller announced he was selling the newspaper to the E.W. Scripps Company of Cincinnati, then the owner of the Daily Camera and the Rocky Mountain News, bringing former rivals Colorado Daily and Daily Camera under the same ownership. Miller left the newspaper in 2007. Scripps later shut down the Daily's freestanding office, moving operations to the Camera's headquarters on Pearl Street in Boulder. In 2009, Scripps sold the Camera and the Daily to MediaNews Group, which also publishes the Denver Post. In December 2013, Digital First Media acquired MediaNews Group properties, including the Daily's parent, Prairie Mountain Publishing.

The Colorado Daily ceased operation in September 2022; releasing their final issue at that date.
