= Greeley Tribune =

Newspaper published in Greeley, Colorado

- Type: Daily newspaper
- Owner: Prairie Mountain Media
- Founder: Nathan Meeker
- Editor: Trevor Reid
- Founded: 1870
- Language: English
- Headquarters: 2400 W 16th St, Suite C, Greeley, CO 80634
- Website: greeleytribune.com

The Greeley Tribune is a newspaper published in Greeley, Colorado.

== History ==
On Nov. 16, 1870, Nathan Meeker first published the Greeley Tribune for the residents of the Union Colony, which later became the town of Greeley, Colorado. The newspaper was named after the New-York Tribune, where Meeker previously worked. Meeker served as both publisher and editor. In 1872, he sold a half-interest in the firm to Edwin J. Carver, and in 1875 Craver became publisher while Meeker remained editor.

In 1878, Meeker was appointed as Indian agent for the White River Utes. In 1879, Meeker was brutally murdered by Ute Indians in what would be remembered as the Meeker Massacre. After his death, his eldest son Ralph Meeker managed the Tribune together with Carver until 1885, when Carver acquired sole ownership.

In 1901, Charles H. Wolfe bought the Tribune from Carver. In 1904, the paper expanded from a weekly into a daily. Charles Hansen worked as editor for about six years until quitting in 1908 to lease and manage the rival Weld County Republican. In 1909, The Daily Pioneer and Greeley Sun merged with the Republican to form the Greeley Republican. In 1913, Wolfe and Hansen agreed to merged their two papers under the Tribune masthead. Hansen would be editor and Wolfe would be circulation manager.

In 1940, the Tribune joined the leased wire network of the Associated Press. In 1953, Hansen died at age 80. His niece and adopted daughter, Miss Mildred Shields Hansen, was then elected head of the firm. In a 1957 profile published in Rocky Mountain News, Miss Hansen was described as one of "Colorado's Most Interesting Women." At that time the paper had 12,000 subscribers and 70 employees. In 1966, her adoptive mother died at age 87.

In 1977, Miss Hansen sold the Tribune to Swift Communications. At that time the circulation was 21,000. In 1980, a Sunday edition was added, making the paper published seven days a week. In 2018, the paper's print schedule was reduced to four days a week: Wednesdays, Fridays, Saturdays and Sundays. In 2019, company founder Philip E. Swift died. In 2021, Ogden Newspapers acquired the company, including the Tribune. In 2020, the Tribune was sold to MediaNews Group.
