= Fort Morgan Times =

Daily newspaper in Fort Morgan, Colorado

- Type: Daily newspaper
- Format: Broadsheet
- Owner: Prairie Mountain Publishing (MediaNews Group)
- Founder(s): Lyman C. Baker and George W. Warne
- Publisher: Brian Porter
- Editor: Sara Waite
- Founded: 1884
- Language: English
- Headquarters: 329 Main Street; Fort Morgan, CO 80701; United States
- Website: fortmorgantimes.com

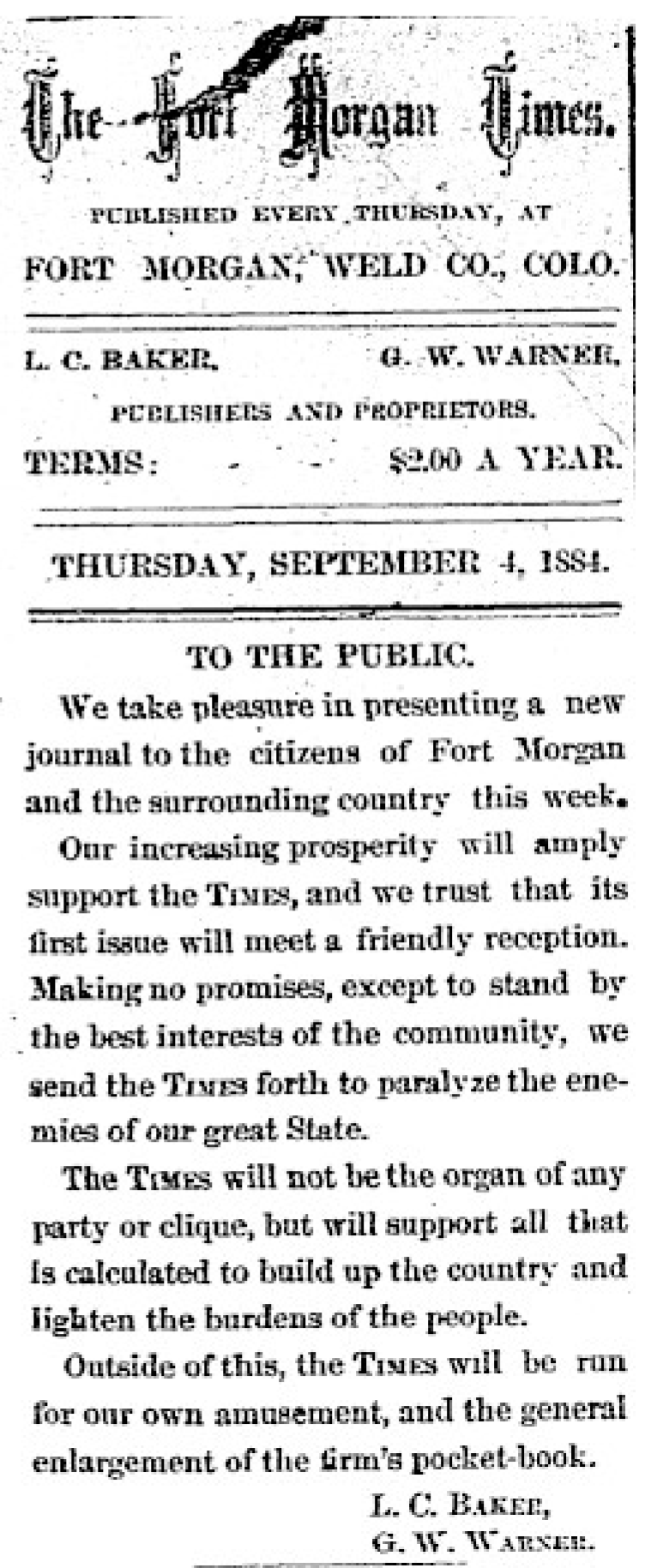
Fort Morgan Times, vol. I, no. 1

The Fort Morgan Times is a daily newspaper in Fort Morgan, Colorado. It has been published by Prairie Mountain Publishing, a unit of MediaNews Group, since 1996, when it was acquired by Hollinger.

== History ==
The Fort Morgan Times was established as a weekly newspaper in September 1884 by Lyman C. Baker and George W. Warner.

In July 2024, the newspaper announced it will publish its final edition on July 27 and be replaced by a weekly paper called The Morgan County Times.
