= Boulder Weekly =

Boulder, Colorado independent weekly newspaper

Coordinates: 39.983791°N 105.247757°W

- Type: Alternative newspaper
- Format: Tabloid
- Owner: Stewart Sallo
- Publisher: Fran Zankowski
- Editor: Shay Castle
- Founded: 1993
- Headquarters: 1495 Canyon Boulevard, Boulder, Colorado
- Circulation: 35,000
- OCLC number: 62674422
- Website: boulderweekly.com

Boulder Weekly was an alternative newsweekly that published every Thursday in Boulder, Colorado. The paper is a member of the Association of Alternative Newsweeklies (AAN) and is owned and published by Stewart Sallo. While there were tentative plans to transition to an employee-owned enterprise with Sallo's planned retirement, the paper abruptly laid off most staff in summer 2025 after the publication of the July 3-9 issue.

== Overview ==
After the Loma Prieta earthquake in 1989, Sallo left Santa Cruz, Calif., where he had ownership of two publications — Summer Santa Cruz and Student Guide. By 1992, he had set his sights on Boulder, Colorado. He moved to Boulder in 1993, and the first edition of Boulder Weekly hit the stands on Aug. 19 of that year.

Between 1996 and 2000, Boulder Planet operated as a competing publication to the Weekly. The continued publication of the Weekly despite the competition has been a source of satisfaction for Sallo.

Initially, Sallo saw the paper as a business opportunity in a city lacking a weekly newspaper. However, an article by Joel Dyer in 1994 reshaped Sallo's view on the newspaper's potential impact ("Deadly ground: Beech Aircraft toxins poison open space," Sept. 14, 1994). As a result, Boulder Weekly's editorial direction shifted toward a more aggressive, alternative approach to news. Dyer later became editor of Boulder Weekly, eventually leaving the paper to write books and publish his own newsweekly, the Fort Collins Weekly, from 2002 to 2007.

Succeeding Dyer, Greg Campbell maintained the investigative editorial direction, publishing articles such as "Eternal flame: Think you've paid at the pump? Try paying with your life. Boulder Weekly visits Nigeria," April 19, 2001, which exposed the suffering of a Nigerian village at the hands of an Italian gas company. Campbell is the author of Blood Diamonds: Tracing the Deadly Path of the World's Most Precious Stones.

Wayne Laugesen, following his tenure at Soldier of Fortune magazine, served as Boulder Weekly's editor. In 2003, Pamela White took on the role of editor, becoming the first woman to do so. She came to the Weekly after serving as editor of Colorado Daily. Joel Dyer returned to the Weekly as editor in November 2011. He was last listed on the masthead as editor-at-large in the April 6, 2023 issue Shay Castle was appointed the new editor on October 30, 2023.

In December 2024, the paper announced that publisher Sallo plans to retire and that staff launched a fundraising campaign to explore the possibility of transitioning the paper an employee-owned co-op.

In July 2025, the Weekly published its last issue. In an interview with community radio station KGNU, Sallo defended his decisions.
