= Sentinel Colorado =

- Type: Weekly newspaper
- Format: Tabloid
- Owner: Aurora Media Group LLC
- Publisher: Dave Perry
- Editor: Dave Perry
- Headquarters: 3033 S Parker Rd, Aurora, CO 80014
- Circulation: 12,000
- Website: sentinelcolorado.com

The Sentinel Colorado (formerly the Aurora Sentinel) is an Aurora, Colorado-based weekly newspaper published every Thursday by Aurora Media Group LLC. For the city of Aurora and the surrounding Arapahoe County, it is the main print news source.

== History ==
The newspaper began in 1972 as the Aurora Advocate Sentinel, which circulated regionally. For decades, it was known as the Aurora Sentinel before becoming a non-profit and rebranding to Sentinel Colorado, which reflects a broader regional coverage footprint.

== See also ==
- List of newspapers in Colorado
