= KWKQ =

Coordinates: 33.042°N 98.779°W

- Graham, Texas; United States
- Broadcast area: Breckenridge, Texas; Newcastle, Texas; Olney, Texas
- Frequency: 94.7 MHz
- Branding: Q94.7

Programming
- Format: Classic rock

Ownership
- Owner: Terry and Kay Slavens; (For the Love of the Game Broadcasting, LLC)
- Sister stations: KLXK

History
- First air date: 1975

Technical information
- Licensing authority: FCC
- Facility ID: 35643
- Class: C3
- ERP: 10,500 watts
- HAAT: 148 meters (486 ft)

Links
- Public license information: Public file; LMS
- Webcast: Listen Live
- Website: kwkqradio.com

KWKQ is a commercial radio station located in Graham, Texas, broadcasting on 94.7 FM. KWKQ airs a classic rock music format.

It is owned by Terry and Kay Slavens, through licensee For the Love of the Game Broadcasting, LLC.
