= Journal-Advocate =

American daily newspaper

- Type: Daily newspaper
- Format: Broadsheet
- Owner(s): Prairie Mountain Publishing (MediaNews Group)
- Publisher: Brian Porter
- Founded: 1885 (as Logan County Advocate)
- Language: English
- Headquarters: 100 Broadway St. Suite 25; Sterling, CO 80701; United States
- Website: journal-advocate.com

The Journal-Advocate is a daily newspaper in Sterling, Colorado. It is published by Prairie Mountain Publishing, which is owned by MediaNews Group.

== History ==
The Wilson brothers founded the Logan County Advocate in 1885 in Atwood. The newspaper was moved to Sterling after it become the county seat two years later. The Wilsons launched the Daily Advocate in 1889. Victor Wilson sold both the daily and weekly newspaper to D.C. Fleming and MR. Lacey in 1896, and the daily paper was discontinued.

The paper was sold in 1900 to F.A. Day, who renamed it to the Sterling Advocate and re-launched the daily edition. Day sold the paper two years later to David C. Smith, editor of the Logan County Republican. Smith renamed the paper four years later to the Sterling Republican. In 1907, he merged his two papers together to form the Sterling Republican-Advocate. Smith then sold the paper to E.N. Heaton.

In 1953, the newspaper was sold to Alonzo and Anna Petteys who two year later merged it with the High Plains Journal to form the Sterling Journal-Advocate.

In 1996, MediaNews acquired the newspaper from Hollinger.

In July 2024, the newspaper announced it will cease publishing its print edition while continuing to post local news for Logan County to its website.
