= KLXK =

Coordinates: 32.792°N 98.940°W

- Breckenridge, Texas; United States
- Broadcast area: Abilene, Texas
- Frequency: 93.5 MHz
- Branding: K-Lakes 93.5

Programming
- Format: Country

Ownership
- Owner: Terry and Kay Slavens; (For the Love of the Game Broadcasting, LLC)
- Sister stations: KWKQ

History
- First air date: 1982
- Former call signs: KROO

Technical information
- Licensing authority: FCC
- Facility ID: 7702
- Class: C3
- ERP: 12,500 Watts
- HAAT: 140 meters (460 ft)

Links
- Public license information: Public file; LMS

KLXK is a commercial radio station located in Breckenridge, Texas, broadcasting to the areas northeast of Abilene, Texas. KLXK airs a country music format branded as "K-Lakes".
