= Lamar, Colorado =

City in Colorado, United States

- Home rule municipality
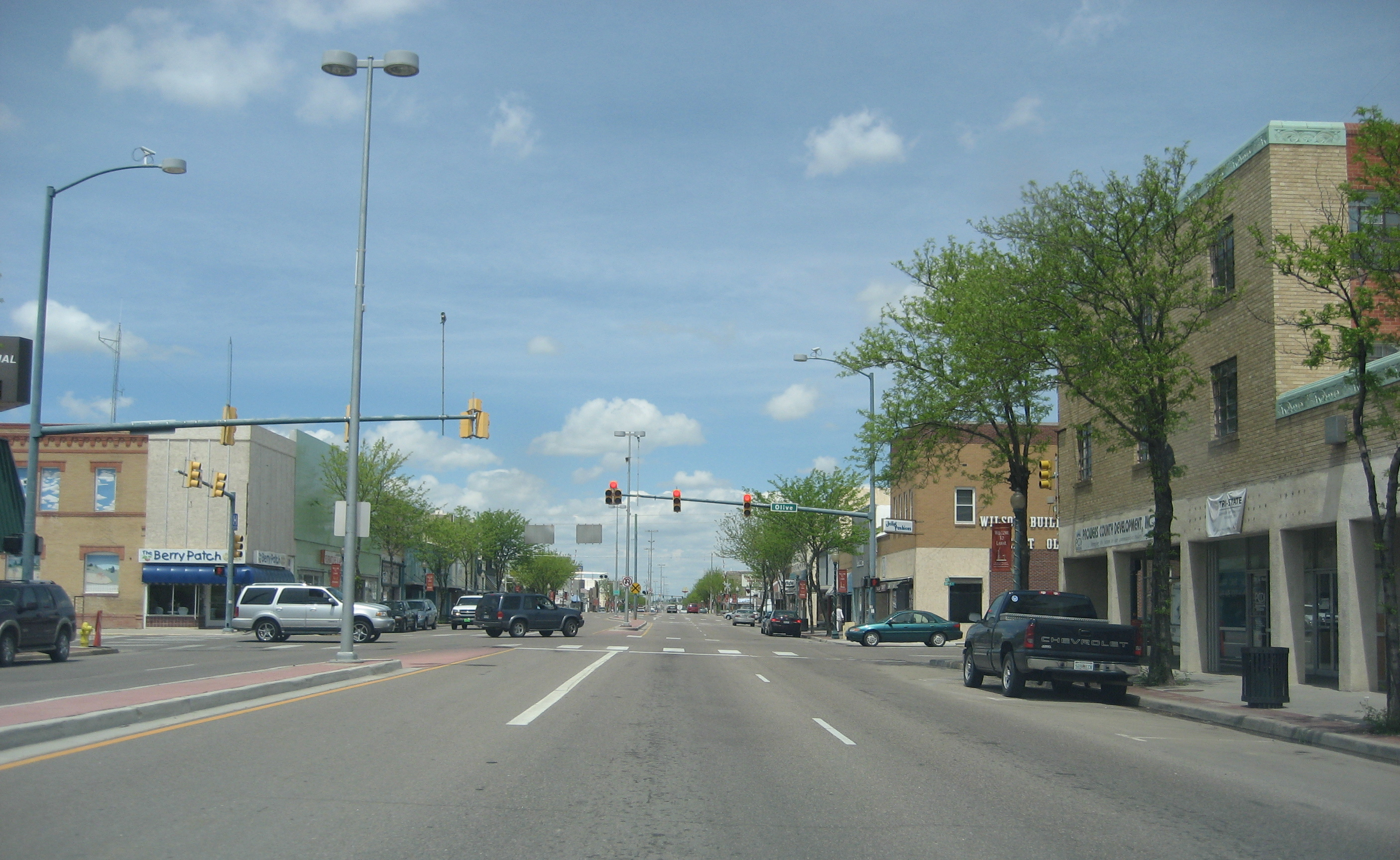
- Main Street facing north in downtown Lamar (2007)

- Location with Prowers County and Colorado
- Coordinates: 38°05′14″N 102°37′15″W
- Country: United States
- State: Colorado
- County: Prowers County
- Incorporated: December 5, 1886

Government
  - Type: Home Rule Municipality
  - Mayor: Kirk Crespin

Area
  - Total: 5.29 sq mi (13.70 km^{2})
  - Land: 5.27 sq mi (13.65 km^{2})
  - Water: 0.019 sq mi (0.05 km^{2})
- Elevation: 3,619 ft (1,103 m)

Population (2020)
  - Total: 7,687
  - Density: 1,459/sq mi (563.2/km^{2})
- Time zone: UTC−7 (MST)
  - Summer (DST): UTC−6 (MDT)
- ZIP Code: 81052
- Area code: 719
- FIPS code: 08-43110
- GNIS ID: 203835
- Website: City Website

Lamar is the home rule municipality that is the county seat of and the most populous municipality in Prowers County, Colorado. The city population was 7,687 at the 2020 United States census. The city was named after Lucius Quintus Cincinnatus Lamar, a Confederate soldier and diplomat who wrote the Mississippi Secession Ordinance, and after the Civil War, went on to serve as U.S. Secretary of the Interior and U.S. Supreme Court Justice. Lamar is the home of Lamar Community College, and is the largest city in southeastern Colorado.

== History ==
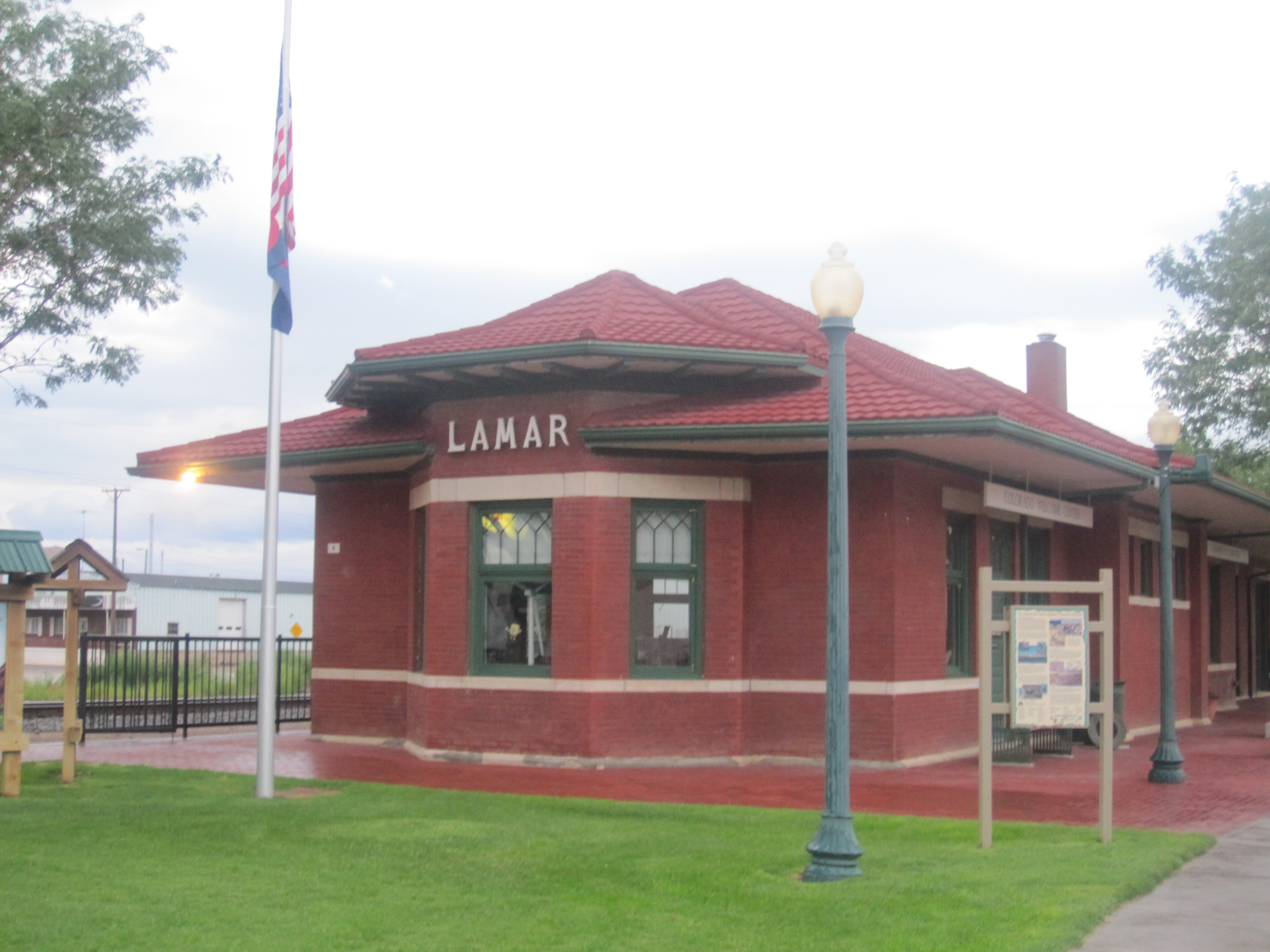
Restored railroad depot and Lamar visitor center (2010)

Lamar was founded on May 24, 1886, by Issac Holmes. It was named after Lucius Quintus Cincinnatus Lamar II, U.S. Secretary of the Interior, the author of the Mississippi Ordinance of Secession, and a Confederate officer and diplomat. The first town elections were held in December, and C. M. Morrison became the town's first mayor. In 1889, Prowers County was established, and Lamar was elected to house the county's government.

Throughout its history, Lamar has suffered from fires and floods. The town was also greatly affected by the Dust Bowl, and as such, participated in projects led by the Civil Works Administration, Federal Emergency Relief Administration, and the Works Progress Administration.

The northern site of the Pierre Auger Observatory of ultra-high energy cosmic rays is planned to be built near Lamar.

== Geography ==
The city lies in southeastern Colorado in northwestern Prowers County on the south side of the Arkansas River floodplain. Las Animas is about twenty miles to the west.

According to the United States Census Bureau, the city has a total area of 4.2 square miles (11 km^{2}), all land.

=== Climate ===
According to the Köppen climate classification, Lamar is located in a cold semi-arid climate (Bsk)

Climate data for Lamar, Colorado (1991–2020 normals, extremes 1893–present)
Month	Jan	Feb	Mar	Apr	May	Jun	Jul	Aug	Sep	Oct	Nov	Dec	Year
Record high °F (°C)	82 (28)	86 (30)	94 (34)	98 (37)	103 (39)	111 (44)	111 (44)	110 (43)	106 (41)	99 (37)	89 (32)	82 (28)	111 (44)
Mean maximum °F (°C)	66.3 (19.1)	72.3 (22.4)	82.9 (28.3)	88.9 (31.6)	95.7 (35.4)	102.7 (39.3)	103.7 (39.8)	101.6 (38.7)	98.3 (36.8)	90.3 (32.4)	78.6 (25.9)	66.5 (19.2)	105.2 (40.7)
Mean daily maximum °F (°C)	45.1 (7.3)	49.2 (9.6)	60.2 (15.7)	68.4 (20.2)	77.7 (25.4)	88.7 (31.5)	93.3 (34.1)	90.6 (32.6)	83.5 (28.6)	69.9 (21.1)	56.4 (13.6)	45.5 (7.5)	69.0 (20.6)
Daily mean °F (°C)	29.4 (−1.4)	33.1 (0.6)	43.3 (6.3)	52.2 (11.2)	62.2 (16.8)	73.1 (22.8)	78.1 (25.6)	75.7 (24.3)	67.5 (19.7)	53.0 (11.7)	39.9 (4.4)	30.0 (−1.1)	53.1 (11.7)
Mean daily minimum °F (°C)	13.7 (−10.2)	17.0 (−8.3)	26.3 (−3.2)	36.1 (2.3)	46.8 (8.2)	57.5 (14.2)	62.9 (17.2)	60.9 (16.1)	51.5 (10.8)	36.0 (2.2)	23.3 (−4.8)	14.4 (−9.8)	37.2 (2.9)
Mean minimum °F (°C)	−1.5 (−18.6)	2.1 (−16.6)	10.3 (−12.1)	21.4 (−5.9)	32.7 (0.4)	45.3 (7.4)	54.5 (12.5)	53.0 (11.7)	37.8 (3.2)	21.1 (−6.1)	8.7 (−12.9)	−1.9 (−18.8)	−7.2 (−21.8)
Record low °F (°C)	−29 (−34)	−30 (−34)	−23 (−31)	8 (−13)	20 (−7)	33 (1)	43 (6)	40 (4)	23 (−5)	1 (−17)	−12 (−24)	−23 (−31)	−30 (−34)
Average precipitation inches (mm)	0.33 (8.4)	0.42 (11)	0.72 (18)	1.46 (37)	1.93 (49)	2.53 (64)	2.81 (71)	2.78 (71)	1.19 (30)	1.08 (27)	0.48 (12)	0.46 (12)	16.19 (411)
Average snowfall inches (cm)	6.3 (16)	5.4 (14)	4.7 (12)	1.7 (4.3)	0.1 (0.25)	0.0 (0.0)	0.0 (0.0)	0.0 (0.0)	0.0 (0.0)	2.1 (5.3)	3.6 (9.1)	5.9 (15)	29.8 (76)
Average precipitation days (≥ 0.01 in)	2.7	3.0	4.2	5.8	7.5	7.4	8.3	7.4	4.6	4.3	3.4	3.2	61.8
Average snowy days (≥ 0.1 in)	2.2	2.0	1.5	0.8	0.1	0.0	0.0	0.0	0.0	0.4	1.3	2.1	10.4
Source: NOAA

== Demographics ==
Historical population
Census	Pop.	Note	%±
1890	566		—
1900	987		74.4%
1910	2,977		201.6%
1920	2,512		−15.6%
1930	4,233		68.5%
1940	4,445		5.0%
1950	6,829		53.6%
1960	7,369		7.9%
1970	7,797		5.8%
1980	7,713		−1.1%
1990	8,343		8.2%
2000	8,869		6.3%
2010	7,804		−12.0%
2020	7,687		−1.5%
U.S. Decennial Census

As of the census of 2010, there were 7,804 people, 3,102 households, and 1,980 families living in the city. The population density was 1,858.1 inhabitants per square mile (717.4/km^{2}). There were 3,666 housing units at an average density of 872.9 units per square mile (337.0 units/km^{2}). The racial makeup of the city was 78.6% White, 0.7% African American, 1.0% Native American, 0.4% Asian, 0.0% Pacific Islander, 16.3% from other races, and 3.0% from two or more races. Hispanic or Latino of any race were 39.7% of the population.

There were 3,102 households, of which 42.2% were married couples living together, 15.8% had a female householder with no husband present, and 36.2% were non-families. 31.8% of all households were made up of individuals living alone, and 12.8% had someone living alone who was 65 years of age or older. The average household size was 2.43 and the average family size was 3.07.

In the city, the population was spread out, with 27.8% under the age of 18, 10.4% from 18 to 24, 23.4% from 25 to 44, 24.3% from 45 to 64, and 14.1% who were 65 years of age or older. The median age was 34.1 years. For every 100 females, there were 93.7 males. For every 100 females age 18 and over, there were 88.8 males.

The median income for a household in the city was $31,521, and the median income for a family was $43,588. Males working full-time and year-round had a median income of $31,621 versus $30,148 for females. The per capita income for the city was $16,944. About 21.4% of families and 24.6% of the population were below the poverty line, including 34.1% of those under age 18 and 15.1% of those age 65 or over.

== Economy ==
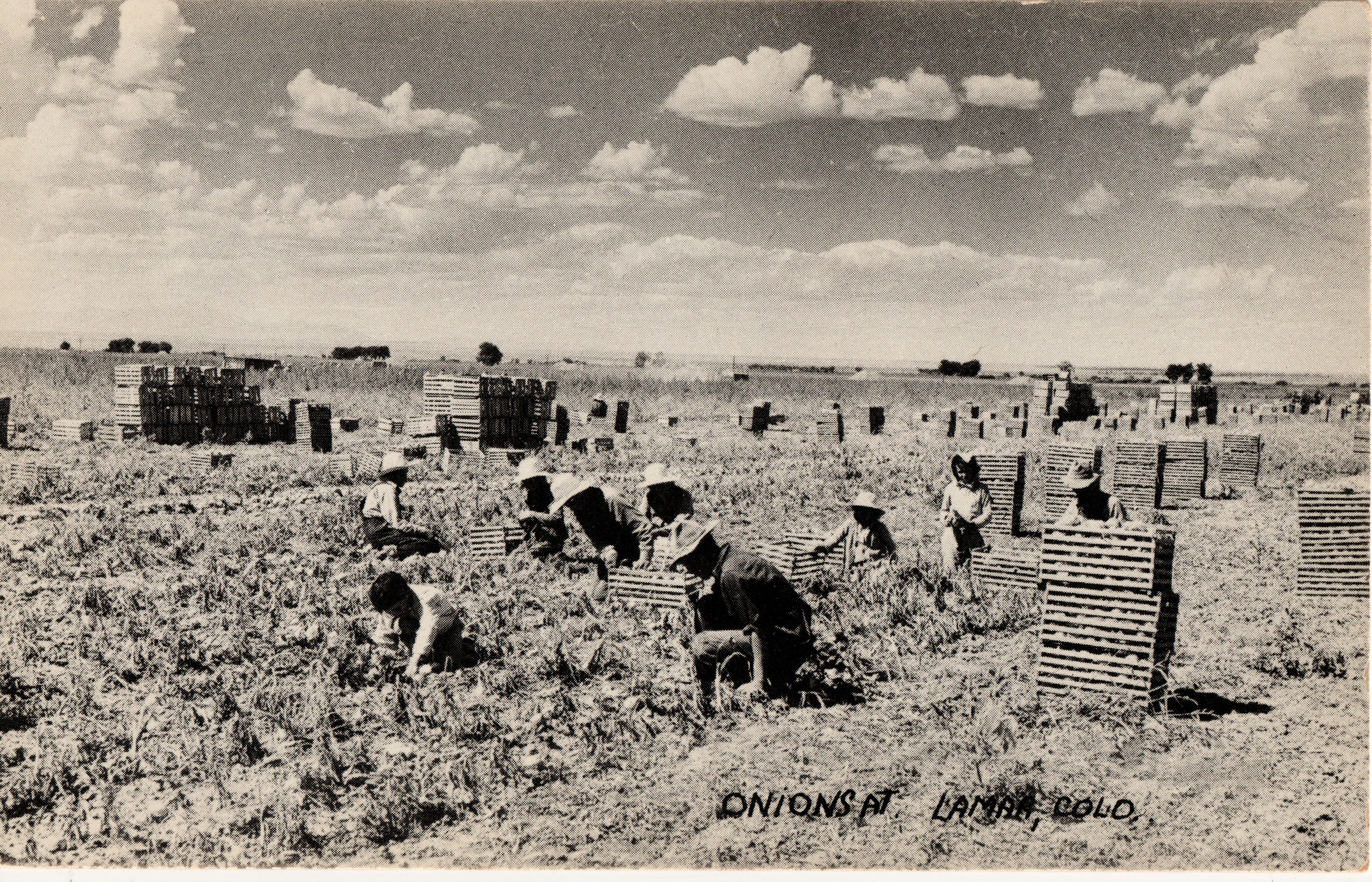
Onions being harvested near Lamar (1940s)

Lamar initially had an agriculture-based economy. In 1981, German bus manufacturer Neoplan opened a manufacturing plant employing 650, but it closed in 2006. Lamar has increasingly relied on tourism.

== Education ==
Lamar is part of School District RE-2, and it is home to Lamar Community College.

== Infrastructure ==
=== Medical ===
Prowers Medical Center, a critical access hospital, serves Lamar and Prowers County. The hospital has an emergency department that is a level IV trauma center.

=== Transportation ===
Lamar receives intercity passenger rail service at the Lamar Amtrak Station via Amtrak's Southwest Chief, which runs between Chicago and Los Angeles. An intercity bus service is also provided by Bustang. Lamar is the last eastbound stop of the Lamar-Pueblo-Colorado Springs Outrider line.

Highways

- US 50 is an east–west highway running from California to Maryland. It is also the main route to Pueblo and Las Animas.
- Prowers County Road 196 (the state has abandoned the highway) is an 11.4-mile (18.3 km) stretch that connects around Lamar to Wiley.
- US 287/385 are two concurrent highways that run south through Lamar. They connect Lamar to Springfield. US 287 runs from Texas State Highway 87 in Port Arthur, Texas, to US 89 at Choteau, Montana. US 385 runs from Big Bend National Park in Texas to US 85 in Deadwood, South Dakota.

== Notable people ==
Notable individuals who were born in or have lived in Lamar include:

- Gordon L. Allott (1907–1989), U.S. Senator from Colorado
- Marvin Ash (1914–1974), jazz pianist
- Ken Curtis (1916–1991), actor, singer
- Scott Elarton (1976- ), baseball pitcher
- Curt Gentry (1931–2014), journalist, non-fiction author
- Gerald Gregg (1907–1985), illustrator, book cover artist
- Wayne R. Grisham (1923–2011), U.S. Representative from California
- Floyd D. Hall (1916–2012), pilot, airline executive
- Sharon Herbaugh (1954–1993), war correspondent for the Associated Press
- Stanley O. Ikenberry (1935-2025), President of the University of Illinois System 1979-1995, 2010.
- Wesley Tuttle (1917–2003), singer-songwriter, guitarist
- Sandy Vance (1947- ), baseball pitcher

== See also ==
- Madonna of the Trail monument
- National Old Trails Road
- Santa Fe National Historic Trail
- The Lamar Ledger
