= Daily Camera =

Daily newspaper in Boulder, Colorado

- Type: Daily newspaper
- Format: Broadsheet
- Owner: Digital First Media
- Founder: Lucius C. Paddock
- Publisher: Albert J. Manzi
- Editor: John Vahlenkamp
- Founded: 1889 (as the Boulder Tribune)
- Language: English
- Headquarters: 3350 Arapahoe Ave; Boulder, Colorado 80303; United States
- Website: dailycamera.com

The Daily Camera is a newspaper in Boulder, Colorado, United States. It is owned by Prairie Mountain Publishing, a division of Digital First Media which is controlled by Alden Global Capital.

== History ==
In 1889, Lucius Carver "Colonel" Paddock published the first issue of the Boulder Tribune. In 1890, Frederick P. Johnson and Bert Bell founded the weekly Boulder Camera, and two months later they acquired and absorbed the Boulder Sentinel.

In 1891, the Hank Stevens slapped Col. Paddock in the face, knocking him to the ground over an article he had published. Later that year the Tribune Publishing Company was formed. In 1892, the owners of the weekly Tribune and the Daily Camera merged into a single company. Ball soon sold out after the merger, and Johnson stayed on until 1903. Paddock's father-in-law, Valentine Butsch, worked as business manager until 1905 when he died.

In 1932, the Camera bought and absorbed the Boulder News Herald. Paddock bought the News Herald from Arthur A. Parkhurst, known as the "crusading editor" of Colorado, who a month after the sale fatally shot himself. In 1940, L.C. Paddock died. His son Alva A. "Governor" Paddock, who was named after Gov. Alva Adams, hence the nickname "Gov", then published the Camera until his death in 1961. While the publisher position was left vacant, his son, Laurence T. Paddock, managed the paper as editor.

In 1969, Ridder Publications Inc. acquired the Daily Camera. L.T. Paddock stayed on as editor and Lu P. Monroe was named publisher. In 1974, the company merged with Knight Newspapers Inc. to form Knight Ridder. In July 1997, Knight Ridder traded the Daily Camera to E. W. Scripps Company in exchange for The Monterey County Herald and San Luis Obispo Tribune.

In 2006, Scripps and MediaNews Group formed a joint venture called Prairie Mountain Media which would manage their smaller newspapers in Colorado. In 2008, the Camera's building was put up for sale and 50 employees were laid off after printing operations were moved from Boulder to Denver. Nine others were laid off earlier in the year due to a decline in classified advertising sales. In 2009, the partnership dissolved and MediaNews assumed full control of the subsidiary. In 2010, the paper's building was sold for $9 million. In 2011, the paper relocated to 5450 Western Ave., and then donated its print archive to the Carnegie Library for Local History. In 2013, MediaNews and Digital First Media merged under the Digital First Media name, with both controlled by Alden Global Capital.

== Awards ==
- 2007 Missouri Lifestyle Journalism Award for General Excellence, Class II
- 2006 Missouri Lifestyle Journalism Award for General Excellence, Class II
