= MediaNews Group =

American newspaper and media company

MNG Enterprises, Inc.
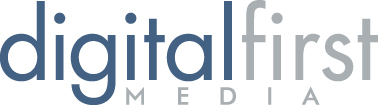
- Trade name: Digital First Media
- Type: Private
- Headquarters: Denver, Colorado, U.S.
- Key people: Michael Koren (CFO); Guy Gilmore (COO); Mac Tully (EVP, Central Region); Sharon Ryan (EVP, Western Region)
- Owner: Alden Global Capital
- Number of employees: 10,000+
- Website: Official website

MNG Enterprises, Inc., doing business as Digital First Media and MediaNews Group, is a Denver, Colorado, United States–based newspaper publisher owned by Alden Global Capital. As of 2026, it owns about 230 newspapers, and reports a monthly print and digital readership of around 47 million combined. (Note: Folkenflik, David (2021-05-21). "'Vulture' Fund Alden Global, Known For Slashing Newsrooms, Buys Tribune Papers". National Public Radio.)

== History ==
The MediaNews Group logo, which still appears on print newspapers.

MediaNews Group was founded by Richard Scudder and William Dean Singleton. Both had experience in the American newspaper industry. Scudder ran the Newark Evening News, a newspaper founded by his grandfather. Singleton had begun his career as a reporter when he was 15, for a small-town Texas newspaper and subsequently became the president of Albritton Communications, a newspaper conglomerate in Texas.

Based in Denver, Colorado, Scudder and Singleton purchased their first newspaper in 1983. They incorporated MediaNews Group in 1985, with Singleton as CEO and Scudder as chairman. The company began to purchase small local newspapers that were financially troubled. The company made its first major acquisition in 1987: The Denver Post. Ultimately, it became one of the largest newspaper companies in the United States: in 2012, it operated 57 daily newspapers in 12 states, with combined a daily circulation of about 2.3 million.

Singleton was a pioneer in "clustering": cutting jobs at individual newspapers and consolidating functions at a hub near a cluster of newspapers. For example, the Alameda Newspaper Group in suburban San Francisco in the mid-1990s had a central newsroom in Pleasanton, California, that did all the copy editing, layout and page makeup for five daily papers. Upon acquiring the diverse group of papers, Singleton consolidated several news sections (such as sports and features) to one local office away from the metropolitan area, having a few reporters do the job of many people.

Singleton soon earned the nickname "Lean Dean" for his slashing of jobs through clustering. His tight-fisted methods were later adopted as the preferred model by Alden Global Capital and other hedge funds that took over near-bankrupt newspaper companies.

In August 2006, Singleton took out around $350 million in loans to purchase four newspapers from McClatchy Company. Among those providing the loan was the Bill and Melinda Gates Foundation. It came out of bankruptcy in March 2010 under the majority ownership of its lenders. The MediaNews creditors then removed MediaNews president Jody Lodovic and its chairman, William Dean Singleton, was reassigned to the position of "executive chairman of the board". The Singleton-Lodovic appointees to the MediaNews board were replaced by new directors representing the stockholders group led by Alden Global Capital, a hedge fund firm which has acquired a large, though not controlling, stake. Several interim executive positions were also filled by people related to Alden or its parent, Smith Management LLC. MediaNews became managed by Journal Register's Digital First Media.

In 2017, the company was ranked third-largest among the newspaper groups in the country. Alden Global Capital has been accused of "strip mining" its newspaper holdings. In October 2017, the company's CEO, Steve Rossi, stepped down from his position. In February 2018, Digital First Media put in a $11.9 million winning bid to purchase the Boston Herald.

In March 2016, a bankruptcy judge approved the sale of Freedom Communications and its two major newspapers, the Orange County Register and the Riverside Press-Enterprise to Digital First Media. The papers were integrated into Digital First Media's Los Angeles Newspaper Group, which was renamed the Southern California News Group on the same day.

In November 2018, Digital First Media announced plans to lay off 107 staff from its Colorado Springs, Colorado financial services operations, as it outsources the work to Genpact starting December 28.

In January 2019, Digital First Media acquired 7.5% of Gannett's public stock, and made an unsolicited bid to acquire Gannett for $1.36 billion. On February 4, Gannett's board "unanimously rejected" the offer, saying "that MNG does not have a realistic plan to acquire Gannett". On February 11, Gannett issued a press release accusing Digital First Media of engaging in a proxy fight. After a failed attempt to place 3 nominees on Gannett's board of directors through a proxy vote in May, DFM reduced their stake to 4.2%. In August 2019, GateHouse Media ultimately announced its intent to acquire Gannett instead.

In February 2020, Digital First Media purchased the assets of Minnesota-based Red Wing Publishing/Big Fish Works. The sale included the Hutchinson Leader, the Litchfield Independent Review, the International Falls Journal, the Lakeshore Weekly News, the Chanhassen Villager, Chaska Herald, Eden Prairie News, Jordan Independent, Shakopee Valley News, Prior Lake American and the Savage Pacer.

In April 2020, two of Minneapolis' west metro newspapers—The Eden Prairie News and Lakeshore Weekly News bought earlier in 2020 by Digital First Media—announced their closure at the end of April 2020 due to a decline in advertising revenue amid the COVID-19 pandemic.

In May 2021, Alden Global Capital acquired Tribune Publishing. With its combined holdings, Alden became the second-largest owner of newspapers in the United States in terms of subscribers, behind only Gannett.

In July 2023, Digital First Media acquired The San Diego Union-Tribune for an undisclosed sum. The next month, the company acquired The Scranton Times-Tribune and three other daily newspapers from Times-Shamrock Communications. The sale included weekly and periodic newspapers and commercial printing operations—Absolute Distribution Inc. and Times-Shamrock Creative Services.

In April 2024, Southwest News Media, owned by Digital First Media, announced its weekly newspapers would cease before the end of the month, including: Chaska Herald, Chanhassen Villager, Jordan Independent, the Shakopee Valley News, Prior Lake American and Savage Pacer. Crow River Media, another subsidiary, announced The Hutchinson Leader and Litchfield Independent Review will also close along with its affiliate printing plant.

In January 2026, the company sold The Detroit News to Gannett, which in 2025 was renamed to USA Today Co.

== Newspapers ==
=== Daily newspapers ===
Listed alphabetically by name, daily newspapers owned by MediaNews include the following: (Note: "Our Brands". MediaNews Group. 2022-04-14.)

- Boston Herald of Boston, Massachusetts
- Chico Enterprise-Record of Chico, California
- The Citizens' Voice of Wilkes-Barre, Pennsylvania
- The Daily Breeze of Torrance, California
- Daily Camera of Boulder, Colorado
- Daily Democrat of Woodland, California
- The Daily Freeman of Kingston, New York
- The Daily News of Palo Alto, California
- The Denver Post of Denver, Colorado
- East Bay Times of Walnut Creek, California
- Ft. Bragg Advocate-News of Fort Bragg, California
- Inland Valley Daily Bulletin of Rancho Cucamonga, California
- Journal Advocate of Sterling, Colorado
- Lake County Record-Bee of Lakeport, California
- Long Beach Press-Telegram of Long Beach, California
- Los Angeles Daily News of Woodland Hills, California
- Marin Independent Journal of San Rafael, California
- Milpitas Post of Milpitas, California
- Monterey County Herald of Monterey, California
- The Nashua Broadcaster of Nashua, New Hampshire
- The Orange County Register of Anaheim, California
- Oroville Mercury Register of Oroville, California
- Pacifica Tribune of Pacifica, California
- Paradise Post of Paradise, California
- Park Record of Park City, Utah
- Pasadena Star-News of Pasadena, California
- The Press Democrat of Santa Rosa, California
- The Press-Enterprise of Riverside, California
- Reading Eagle of Reading, Pennsylvania
- Republican Herald of Pottsville, Pennsylvania
- Red Bluff Daily News of Red Bluff, California
- Redlands Daily Facts of Redlands, California
- The Reporter of Vacaville, California
- The Scranton Times-Tribune of Scranton, Pennsylvania
- The San Diego Union-Tribune of San Diego, California
- San Gabriel Valley Tribune of Monrovia, California
- San Jose Mercury News of San Jose, California
- Santa Cruz Sentinel of Santa Cruz, California
- Sentinel & Enterprise of Fitchburg, Massachusetts
- Standard Speaker of Hazleton, Pennsylvania
- St. Paul Pioneer Press of St. Paul, Minnesota
- The Sun of Lowell, Massachusetts
- The Sun of San Bernardino, California
- Times-Herald of Vallejo, California
- Times-Standard of Eureka, California
- Tri-Valley Herald of Pleasanton, California
- Ukiah Daily Journal of Ukiah, California
- Whittier Daily News of Whittier, California
- Willits News of Willits, California

=== Weekly newspapers ===
Some of the weeklies owned by the company:

- Argus-Courier of Petaluma, California (published twice a week)
- Colorado Hometown Weekly, serving east Boulder County, Colorado communities of Erie, Lafayette, Louisville, Superior
- Gazette Newspapers, two weekly newspapers in Long Beach, California
- Excélsior, three Spanish-language newspapers in Southern California
- Lamar Ledger of Lamar, Colorado
- Nashoba Publishing, several weekly newspapers in northern Massachusetts
- Sonoma Index-Tribune of Sonoma, California

=== Former newspapers ===
- The Argus of Fremont, California
- Brush News-Tribune of Brush, Colorado
- Daily Review of Hayward, California
- Fairbanks Daily News-Miner of Fairbanks, Alaska
- Fort Morgan Times of Fort Morgan, Colorado
- Kodiak Daily Mirror of Kodiak, Alaska
- Lamar Ledger of Lamar, Colorado
- Oakland Tribune of Oakland, California
- Potomac News of Woodbridge, Virginia
- The Salt Lake Tribune of Salt Lake City, Utah
- San Mateo County Times of San Mateo, California
- The Detroit News, Detroit, Michigan

== Other properties ==
Other MediaNews properties include:

- LA.com, a portal site based in Los Angeles, California
- U-Entertainment of Los Angeles, California
- Woman Magazine of Norwalk, Connecticut

== Former properties ==
- Charleston Daily Mail, a former newspaper in Charleston, West Virginia
- KTVA television (CBS Affiliate) in Anchorage, Alaska (March 2000-December 2012) Now owned by Alaska Public Media.
- Lake Country Radio stations (now owned by High Plains Radio Network, LLC):
  - KLXK – Breckenridge, Texas
  - KROO – Breckenridge, Texas
  - KSWA – Graham, Texas
  - KWKQ – Graham, Texas

== Business approach ==
=== Cost-cutting ===
MediaNews Group is known as cutthroat in the newspaper publishing industry. The company has a reputation for buying smaller daily newspapers in a single area (examples include Los Angeles and the San Francisco Bay Area) and consolidating their operations, including sharing staff writers and printing facilities.

William Dean Singleton was quick to point out MediaNews' commitment to print journalism but resisted efforts to develop online web sites for his newspapers, believing print would remain the format favored by readers.

In recent years similar criticism has been aimed at the new organizational structure under Digital First Media. The Denver Post editorial staff and others have criticized the owners of hedge fund group, Alden Global Capital. Alden has a reputation for cutting costs by reducing the number of journalists working on its newspapers as Singleton had done and March 2018, The Washington Post called Alden "one of the most ruthless of the corporate strip-miners seemingly intent on destroying local journalism."

=== Pension funds ===
The company has been criticized for investing its employee pensions in funds managed by its parent company, Alden Global Capital.
