= Nevada Press Association =

American news publication member trade organization

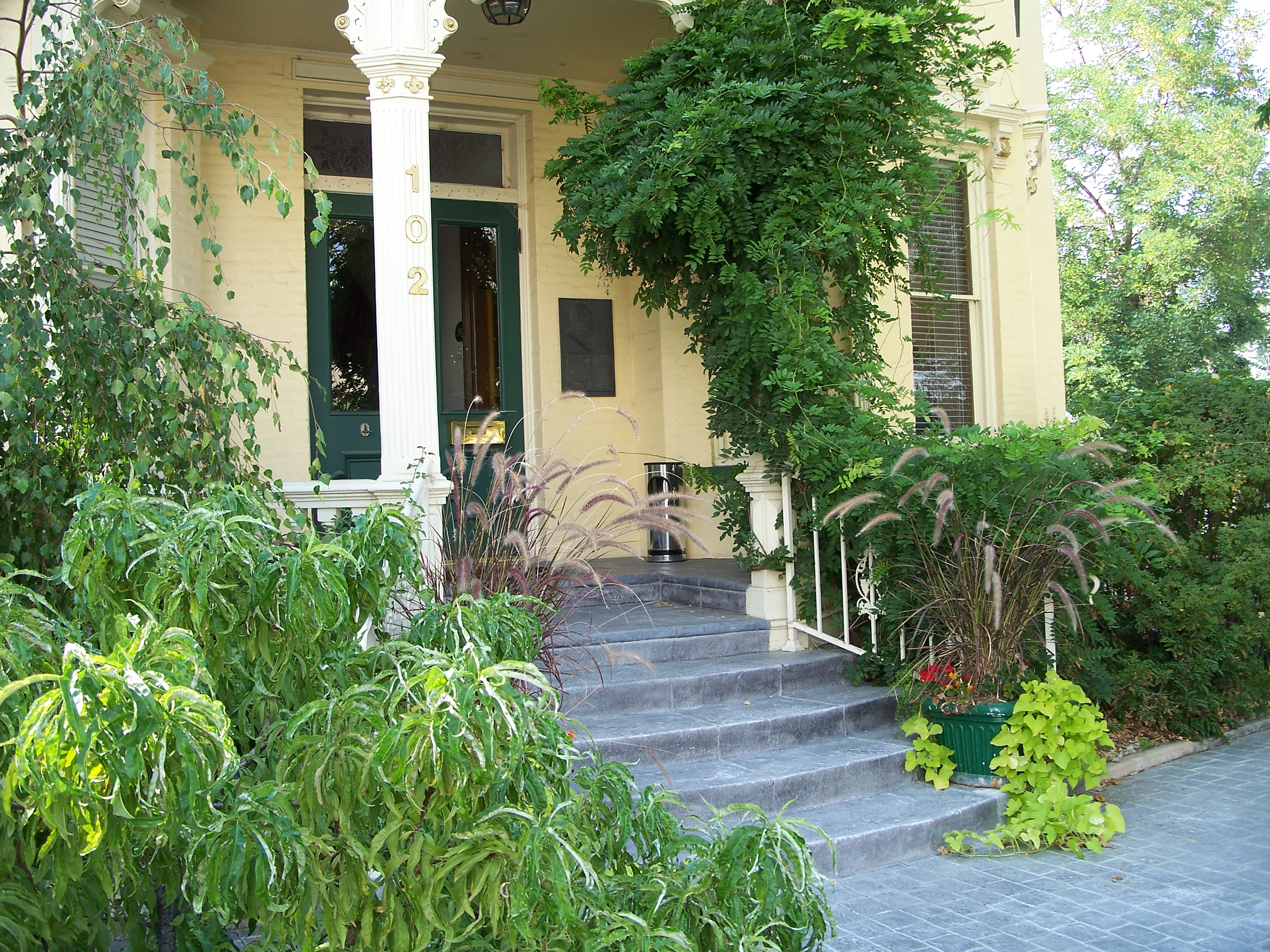
- Rinckel Mansion
- Formation: 1888; 138 years ago
- Headquarters: 102 N. Curry Street, Carson City, Nevada
- Official language: English
- Website: www.nevadapress.com

The Nevada Press Association is the official member trade organization for news publications in the state of Nevada. It is a non-profit organization that represents seven daily and thirty-five weekly news publications in Nevada and the Lake Tahoe region of Northern California, as well as two online news services.

== History ==
The history of the NPA dates back to 1888, when an association of Nevada newspapers was first organized, with Mark Twain a founding member. In 1924, the organization officially became the Nevada State Press Association after a journalism professor at the University of Nevada, Reno spearheaded a reorganization campaign. The organization dropped the word "State" from its name in 1995, becoming the Nevada Press Association. The board of directors that governs the association is composed of 11 officers elected by member newspapers from around the state.

Each year, the NPA hosts a Better Newspapers Contest in which member publications compete for first, second and third place in categories ranging from Best Feature to Journalist of Merit (given to journalists with less than five years' experience), judged by an out-of-town press association.

The offices of the Nevada Press Association were located in the historic Rinckel Mansion, built in 1876, from 2000 until 2021 when the foundation sold the building. It was sold so the organization could focus on fostering and promoting good journalism in Nevada.

== Mission statement ==
The mission statement of the association is as follows: "The Nevada Press Association is dedicated to representing the common interests of Nevada newspapers, furthering the public's right to know through an understanding that strong newspapers (protected by the First Amendment) are the cornerstone of a democratic society, promoting a closer fellowship within the newspaper fraternity, encouraging the elevation of journalistic standards and promoting the value of newspaper advertising."

== NPA Member publications ==
=== Daily newspapers ===
- Elko Daily Free Press
- Las Vegas Review-Journal
- Las Vegas Sun
- Reno Gazette-Journal
- Nevada Appeal
- Sparks Tribune

=== Non-daily newspapers ===
- Battle Mountain Bugle
- Boulder City Review
- Comstock Chronicle
- Construction Notebook
- Dayton Courier
- Desert Valley Times
- El Tiempo
- Ely Times
- Eureka Sentinel
- Fernley Leader
- Gaming Today
- The Humboldt Sun
- High Desert Advocate
- VEGAS INC
- Lahontan Valley News
- Las Vegas Business Press
- Las Vegas CityLife
- Las Vegas Weekly
- Lincoln County Record
- Lovelock Review-Miner
- Mason Valley News
- Mesquite Local News
- Mineral County Independent-News
- Moapa Valley Progress
- Nevada Legal News
- Nevada Rancher
- North Lake Tahoe Bonanza
- Northern Nevada Business Weekly
- Pahrump Valley Times
- The Record-Courier
- Reno News & Review
- Sierra Sun
- Tahoe Daily Tribune
- Tahoe World
- Tonopah Times-Bonanza
- Vegas Seven
- View
- Virginia City News
- Wells Progress
- Wendover Times

=== Specialized publication ===
- Athlon Sports
- CarsonNow.org
- Construction Notebook
- El Tiempo
- Gaming Today
- VEGAS INC
- Las Vegas Business Press
- Nevada Legal News
- Nevada Magazine
- The Nevada Rancher
- Northern Nevada Business Weekly
- Veterans Reporter
- View
