= List of newspapers in Nevada =

This is a list of newspapers in Nevada.

== Daily newspapers ==
- Elko Daily Free Press - Elko
- Las Vegas Review-Journal - Las Vegas
- Las Vegas Sun - Las Vegas
- Reno Gazette-Journal - Reno
- Nevada Legal News - Elko

== Weekly newspapers ==
- Boulder City Review - Boulder City
- Clark County Legal News - Henderson
- Comstock Chronicle - Virginia City
- Ely Times - Ely
- Eureka Sentinel - Eureka
- Great Basin Sun - Battle Mountain, Lovelock, Winnemucca
- High Desert Advocate - West Wendover
- Lahontan Valley News - Fallon
- Lincoln County Record - Lincoln County
- Mesa Valleys Progress - Moapa Valley, Mesquite
- Mineral County Independent-News - Hawthorne
- Nevada Legal Press - Pahrump
- Nevada Appeal - Carson City
- Pahrump Valley Times - Pahrump
- Record-Courier - Gardnerville
- Sparks Tribune - Sparks
- Tonopah Times-Bonanza & Goldfield News - Tonopah

== Monthly newspapers ==
- Mesquite Monthly - Mesquite
- Reno News & Review - Reno

== Defunct ==
- Boulder City News (1937–2009)
- Henderson Home News (1948–2010)
- Tonopah Daily Bonanza (1906–1929)

== Digital only newspapers ==
- The Nevada Independent - Las Vegas

== See also ==
Comprehensive

- Lists of newspapers
- List of newspapers in the United States

Frequency

- List of free daily newspapers in the United States
- List of weekly newspapers in the United States

Circulation

- List of international newspapers originating in the United States
- List of national newspapers in the United States
- List of newspapers in the United States by circulation

Foreign language

- List of French-language newspapers published in the United States
- List of German-language newspapers published in the United States
- List of Spanish-language newspapers published in the United States

Specialty

- List of African-American newspapers in the United States
- List of alternative weekly newspapers in the United States
- List of business newspapers in the United States
- List of family-owned newspapers in the United States
- List of Jewish newspapers in the United States
- List of LGBTQ periodicals in the United States
- List of student newspapers in the United States
- List of supermarket tabloids in the United States
- List of underground press in the United States

Other

- List of defunct newspapers of the United States
