= 2016 Colorado Amendment 69 =

Proposed amendment to the Colorado Constitution

- November 8, 2016
- Creation of ColoradoCare System

Results
Choice	Votes	%
Yes	568,683	21.23%
No	2,109,868	78.77%
Total votes	2,678,551	100.00%

Yes
60–70%
50–60%
No
90–100%
80–90%
70–80%
60–70%
50–60%
Other
Tie
No votes

Amendment 69 was an initiated constitutional amendment that appeared on the November 8, 2016, ballot in the state of Colorado. The measure aimed to create a universal healthcare scheme for state residents by establishing ColoradoCare, which would be paid for through the introduction of a 10% payroll tax.

The amendment faced bipartisan opposition and was rejected by Colorado voters in a landslide, failing to pass in each of the state's 64 counties.

== Background ==
Amendment 69 was a citizen-initiated constitutional amendment that would have established ColoradoCare, a statewide program to provide universal healthcare coverage for state residents. It was placed on the November 2016 ballot after receiving 156,000 signatures in support, meeting the minimum of 99,000. ColoradoCare would have operated as a cooperative, with members (Note: Eligible residents who have chosen to use ColoradoCare) electing 21 trustees to oversee operations and vote on tax increases to allocate additional funding to the program.

ColoradoCare would have been primarily funded through the introduction of a 10% payroll tax, with two-thirds paid by employers and one-third paid by employees. Provisions in the Affordable Care Act mean that Colorado could have received federal funding towards the universal healthcare system. A portion of Social Security and retirement income — up to $33,000 for individuals and $60,000 for couples — would have been exempt from the ColoradoCare tax. High-income earners would have only paid ColoradoCare taxes on income below $350,000.

In 2013, over half of Colorado's population were insured through their employers, while another 12% were covered by Medicaid. The state's uninsured rate was identical to the national rate of 13%. The introduction of ColoradoCare would not have prevented residents from purchasing private health insurance, and the Colorado Health Institute estimated that 83% of Colorado's population, or around 4.4 million people, would have been eligible for primary health insurance coverage through the system, while the remaining 17% would be covered by Medicare, military, or other federal government insurance.

== Campaign ==
=== Support ===
The campaign in favor of Amendment 69 was primarily led by the organization ColoradoCare YES. State senator Irene Aguilar, who The Guardian called the "chief architect" of ColoradoCare, claimed that a "disconnect" existed between "the powers that be and the people" in relation to healthcare coverage. Aguilar defended the proposal against economic concerns, pointing out that residents already pay $25 billion yearly – the estimated cost of ColoradoCare – in the form of a penalty tax for not having a healthcare plan, much of which is used to fund ObamaCare subsidies.

Bernie Sanders was the lone U.S. senator in support of Amendment 69, telling The Colorado Independent that the state could lead the way to improve healthcare, adding that the United States was "the richest nation on earth" and should therefore make healthcare a right for all citizens.

Logo of ColoradoCare YES

After the Colorado Health Institute conducted a study estimating deficits of over $8 billion after a decade of ColoradoCare, the Colorado Foundation for Universal Health Care came out in support of the program and stated that the Health Institute's study failed to include revenue from Medicaid or account for the slowed growth of health care inflation from a single-payer system. The foundation conducted their own study, concluding that ColoradoCare was financially feasible and would result in a net positive impact on the state's economy. The ColoradoCare YES campaign also released an analysis, which estimated the state would save $6.2 billion in administrative costs while residents would see a $4.5 billion reduction in expenses.

Boulder-based newspaper The Daily Camera described efforts to understand the effects of Amendment 69 as "a little like looking at the outline of a novel and trying to imagine the finished book." Nonetheless, the paper's editorial board narrowly voted to endorse the measure, urging Colorado residents to cast a protest vote in support of a better healthcare system. In their endorsement, the board said that voting "no" implies approval of the current healthcare system.

=== Opposition ===
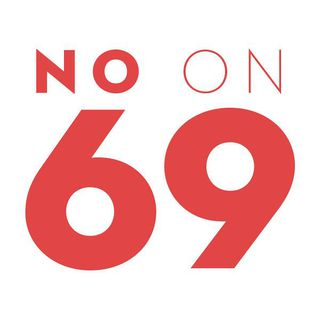
Logo of Coloradans for Coloradans, also known as No on 69

Amendment 69 received opposition from national and state politicians from both major parties, with the group Coloradans for Coloradans (also referred to as No on 69) leading the opposition campaign. ColoradoCare YES claimed most of Coloradans for Coloradans' funding came from corporations. Sean Duffy, a spokesperson for Coloradans for Coloradans, told The Guardian that the group had spoken to numerous companies who have said that the amendment would hurt their ability to operate.

Opponents, including hospitals and insurers, raised more than $5 million, significantly overshadowing the $900,000 raised by supporters of the amendment. Health insurance provider Anthem (now known as Elevance Health), spent over $1 million opposing Amendment 69.

Coloradans for Coloradans hired the Democratic consultant firm Global Strategy Group, who were simultaneously working with Priorities USA Action, a super PAC associated with Hillary Clinton's presidential campaign. Clinton briefly mentioned Amendment 69 at a 2015 campaign rally in Boulder, but did not explicitly make a case for or against the measure. In October 2016 as part of the Podesta emails, WikiLeaks released email correspondence between Clinton campaign staffers warning against mentioning ColoradoCare in speeches. Campaign manager Robby Mook purportedly wrote that the campaign were "avoiding ... [healthcare coverage] because of the single payer referendum," to which deputy communications director Kristina Schake responded, "[Clinton's state campaign manager] Brad [Komar] asked us not to do health care tomorrow in Colorado because of the ballot initiative. Said it won't be helpful there."

Despite the Colorado Democratic Party's 2016 platform featuring support for Amendment 69, many of the state's prominent Democrats, including governor John Hickenlooper and senator Michael Bennet, opposed the measure. Abortion rights group NARAL Pro-Choice, now known as Reproductive Freedom for All, also opposed Amendment 69. While the organization reiterated their support for universal healthcare, they argued that a 1984 constitutional ban on the use of public funds for abortions would prohibit ColoradoCare from covering the procedure, limiting access for low-income earners. The Rocky Mountains chapter of Planned Parenthood endorsed against the measure for the same reason. ColoradoCare YES criticized this position, claiming that Amendment 69 would supersede the 1984 ban, which was enshrined in the state's constitution.

== Endorsements ==
Yes

U.S. senators

- Bernie Sanders, Vermont (2007–present) (Independent)

State legislators

- Irene Aguilar, state senator from the 32nd district (2011–2019) (Democratic)
- Jeanne Nicholson, former state senator from the 16th district (2011–2015) (Democratic)

Individuals

- Noam Chomsky, linguist and political activist
- Arn Menconi, environmental activist (Green) (Note: Menconi has since registered as a Democrat.)
- Paul Noel Fiorino, perennial candidate
- T. R. Reid, journalist
- Gloria Steinem, journalist (Democratic)

Political parties

- Colorado Democratic Party

Organizations

- American Friends Service Committee
- Citizens for Responsibility and Ethics in Washington
- Healthcare Now
- League of Women Voters of Colorado
- Our Revolution
- Progressive Democrats of America
- Public Citizen

Newspapers

- The Aurora Sentinel
- The Daily Camera
No

U.S. senators

- Michael Bennet, Colorado (2009–present) (Democratic)

U.S. representatives

- Ken Buck, CO-04 (2015–2024) (Republican)
- Mike Coffman, CO-06 (2009–2019) (Republican)
- Doug Lamborn, CO-05 (2007–2025) (Republican)
- Scott Tipton, CO-03 (2011–2021) (Republican)

Statewide officials

- Cynthia Coffman, attorney general of Colorado (2015–2019) (Republican)
- John Hickenlooper, governor of Colorado (2011–2019) (Democratic) (Note: Since 2021, Hickenlooper has represented Colorado in the U.S. Senate.)
- Bill Owens, former governor of Colorado (1999–2007) (Republican)
- Bill Ritter, former governor of Colorado (2007–2011) (Democratic)
- Walker Stapleton, treasurer of Colorado (2011–2019) (Republican)
- Wayne Williams, secretary of state of Colorado (2015–2019) (Republican)

State legislators

- Morgan Carroll, president of the Colorado Senate (2013–2015) from the 29th district (2009–2017) (Democratic)
- Crisanta Duran, House majority leader (2015–2017) from the 5th district (2011–2019) (Democratic)
- Bob Gardner, former state representative from the 20th district (2007–2015) (Republican) (Note: Gardner was later elected to the Colorado State Senate representing the 12th district from 2017 to 2025.)
- Daniel Kagan, state representative from the 3rd district (2009–2017) (Democratic)

Individuals

- John Elway, former NFL quarterback and manager of the Denver Broncos (Republican)

Political parties

- Libertarian Party of Colorado

Labor unions

- United Food and Commercial Workers

Organizations

- Americans for Prosperity
- Associated General Contractors of America
- Colorado Hospital Association
- Colorado Medical Society
- Colorado Association of Realtors
- Encana
- ProgressNow
- NARAL Pro-Choice Colorado
- San Luis Valley Health
- Yampa Valley Medical Center

Newspapers

- Colorado Springs Independent
- Fort Collins Coloradoan
- Greeley Tribune
- Glenwood Springs Post Independent
- Longmont Times-Call
- Loveland Reporter-Herald
- The Denver Post
Declined to endorse

U.S. representatives

- Diana DeGette, CO-01 (1997–present) (Democratic)

Individuals

- Jill Stein, Green Party presidential nominee in 2012 and 2016 (Green) (Note: Stein later ran for President again in 2024.)

Labor unions

- AFL-CIO Colorado

== Polling ==
Poll source	Date(s) administered	Sample size (Note: Key: A – all adults RV – registered voters LV – likely voters V – unclear)	Margin of error	Yes	No	Undecided
Franklin & Marshall-Colorado Mesa University	September 14–18, 2016	540 (RV)	± 5.10%	30%	56%	14%
Magellan Strategies	August 29–31, 2016	500 (RV)	± 4.38%	27%	65%	8%
Magellan Strategies	January 27–31, 2016	751 (LV)	± 3.58%	43%	50%	7%

An August 2016 poll by Magellan Strategies found broad opposition to Amendment 69, with the ballot measure failing to gain net approval from any age group, gender, or political affiliation.

Magellan Strategies poll, August 29–31
	All voters	Men	Women	18–34	35–44	45–54	55–64	65+	Democrat	Republican	Unaffiliated
Reject	65%	68%	62%	59%	62%	67%	62%	64%	45%	88%	60%
Approve	27%	27%	26%	40%	32%	26%	25%	18%	41%	7%	33%
Undecided	8%	5%	12%	1%	6%	7%	13%	18%	14%	5%	7%

== Results ==
Amendment 69
Choice	Votes	%
For	568,683	21.23
Against	2,109,868	78.77
Total	2,678,551	100.00
Source: Colorado Secretary of State

=== By county ===
County	For		Against		Total votes cast
County	#	%	#	%	Total votes cast
Adams	32,199	26.67%	136,235	73.33%	185,793
Alamosa	1,304	22.58%	5,489	77.42%	7,090
Arapahoe	59,879	20.51%	232,136	79.49%	292,015
Archuleta	1,154	16.29%	5,928	83.71%	7,082
Baca	160	7.68%	1,922	92.32%	2,082
Bent	249	13.21%	1,636	86.79%	1,885
Boulder	68,312	38.20%	110,509	61.80%	178,821
Broomfield	7,675	21.90%	29,029	79.10%	36,704
Chaffee	2,661	24.02%	8,416	75.98%	11,077
Cheyenne	73	6.70%	1,016	93.30%	1,089
Clear Creek	1,269	12.12%	4,467	77.88%	5,736
Conejos	571	14.60%	3,338	85.40%	3,909
Costilla	467	27.52%	1,230	72.48%	1,697
Crowley	167	11.17%	1,328	88.83%	1,495
Custer	387	12.77%	2,643	87.23%	3,030
Delta	2,528	15.33%	13,962	84.67%	16,490
Denver	102,543	32.95%	208,676	67.05%	311,219
Dolores	170	14.29%	1,020	85.71%	1,190
Douglas	22,815	12.43%	160,782	87.57%	183,597
Eagle	6,045	25.02%	18,116	74.98%	24,162
El Paso	47,591	15.01%	259,320	84.49%	306,911
Elbert	1,303	8.17%	14,461	91.73%	15,764
Fremont	2,987	13.76%	18,724	86.24%	21,711
Garfield	5,721	22.14%	20,123	77.86%	25,845
Gilpin	948	26.86%	2,581	73.14%	3,529
Grand	1,881	22.22%	6,585	77.78%	8,466
Gunnison	2,924	31.92%	6,235	68.08%	9,159
Hinsdale	102	17.35%	486	82.65%	588
Huerfano	750	20.48%	2,913	79.52%	3,663
Jackson	96	11.85%	714	88.15%	810
Jefferson	60,670	18.90%	260,336	81.10%	321,006
Kiowa	54	6.51%	775	93.49%	829
Kit Carson	275	7.64%	3,323	92.36%	3,598
La Plata	7,831	26.18%	21,965	73.72%	29,796
Lake	872	18.16%	2,225	71.84%	3,097
Larimer	43,007	22.90%	144,792	77.10%	187,799
Las Animas	1,174	18.11%	5,307	81.89%	6,481
Lincoln	207	8.66%	2,183	91.34%	2,390
Logan	844	8.90%	8,643	91.10%	9,487
Mesa	11,439	15.33%	63,683	84.77%	75,122
Mineral	135	21.33%	498	78.67%	633
Moffat	667	10.52%	5,676	89.48%	6,343
Montezuma	2,643	21.16%	9,848	78.84%	12,491
Montrose	2,867	23.79%	17,924	86.21%	20,791
Morgan	1,433	12.28%	10,235	87.72%	11,668
Otero	1,122	13.43%	7,234	86.57%	8,356
Ouray	1,033	32.02%	2,193	67.98%	3,226
Park	1,808	17.73%	8,387	82.27%	10,195
Phillips	203	9.01%	2,050	90.99%	2,253
Pitkin	3,556	35.75%	6,391	64.25%	9,947
Prowers	519	11.57%	4,391	89.43%	4,910
Pueblo	12,272	16.11%	63,900	83.89%	76,172
Rio Blanco	266	7.98%	3,068	92.02%	3,334
Rio Grande	860	15.88%	4,555	84.12%	5,415
Routt	3,496	25.43%	10,192	74.57%	13,668
Saguache	911	32.27%	1,827	66.73%	2,738
San Juan	163	34.98%	303	65.02%	466
San Miguel	1,829	44.93%	2,242	55.07%	4,071
Sedgwick	153	11.52%	1,175	88.48%	1,328
Summit	4,610	29.52%	11,009	70.48%	15,619
Teller	1,803	12.79%	12,297	87.21%	14,100
Washington	170	6.34%	2,512	93.66%	2,682
Weld	20,037	15.24%	111,477	84.76%	131,514
Yuma	394	8.39%	4,300	91.61%	4,694
Total	568,683	21.23%	2,109,868	78.77%	2,678,551

== Analysis ==
Counties that voted for Clinton and against Amendment 69

Amendment 69 failed in each of Colorado's 64 counties, including the 22 counties won by Hillary Clinton in the concurrent presidential election. The ballot measure performed best in San Miguel County, with a 44.93% "Yes" vote, though Clinton carried the county by 45 points. Washington County recorded the highest "No" vote at 93.66%, outpacing Donald Trump's performance by almost 10 points.

The public policy think tank Third Way partially attributed the landslide defeat of Amendment 69 to public opposition to ColoradoCare from prominent Democratic politicians, including governor John Hickenlooper, Michael Bennet, and former governor Bill Ritter. They noted an August 2016 poll that showed 41% of Democrats supported Amendment 69, while 45% opposed it.

== Aftermath ==
=== Reactions ===
Irene Aguilar, a lead supporter of Amendment 69, responded to the results by saying "[w]in or lose, the issue of guaranteed access to healthcare for everyone without financial barriers was finally brought before the voters." Lyn Gullette, a ColoradoCare YES staffer, promised to continue campaigning for universal healthcare, while the group's spokesman Owen Perkins criticized the language used to describe Amendment 69 on the ballot, arguing that it omitted their estimates that ColoradoCare would save money long-term. He also said that the "Yes" campaign was defeated by some of "the biggest multi-billion dollar corporations in the country."

The Colorado Hospital Association said it was pleased that Amendment 69 was rejected by voters. "It was too risky, too uncertain and unaffordable for Colorado," the association wrote in a statement. Dr. Katie Lozano, president of the Colorado Medical Society, who largely opposed ColoradoCare, clarified that the amendment's failure does not show approval for the state's current healthcare system.

Journalist T. R. Reid, who supported Amendment 69, attributed the landslide loss to lopsided campaign spending, and told Colorado Public Radio that supports of ColoradoCare were "viciously outspent by the insurance companies", referencing large donations to the "No" campaign by insurance companies UnitedHealth, Anthem, Kaiser and Cigna.

== See also ==
- 2002 Oregon Ballot Measure 23
- 2017 Maine Question 2
- 2018 Idaho Proposition 2
- 2020 Missouri Amendment 2
