= Magellan Strategies =

Political polling firm that serves Republican Party candidates and organizations

- Magellan Data and Mapping Strategies
- Formation: 2006
- Type: Public opinion research firm
- Headquarters: Broomfield, Colorado
- Location: United States
- Website: magellanstrategies.com

Magellan Strategies, formerly known as Magellan Data and Mapping Strategies, is a public opinion research firm based in Broomfield, Colorado. The company was founded in November 2006. Their primary clients include government organizations, school districts, special districts (fire, recreation, library, metro, etc.), and public policy organizations. Their primary survey research projects include resident and community surveys, voter opinion ballot measure surveys, and public policy surveys.

Magellan Strategies is an associate member of the Colorado Association of School Boards, Colorado Association of School Executives, Colorado Rural Schools Alliance, and the Colorado School Finance Project. It is also a member of the International City/County Management Association, the Colorado City & County Management Association, Colorado Counties, Inc., and the Special District Association of Colorado.

The company formerly worked for Republican candidates and conservative organizations.

== Survey weighting methodology ==
Magellan Strategies utilizes a national database of registered voters and MMS text survey invitations to engage respondents. In addition, they use vote history to determine their survey demographics goals, including gender, age group, party registration, and race. This methodology has proven to be very effective in accurately forecasting support and opposition levels in ballot measure elections.

== Public polling and media references ==
=== 2017 references ===
- Magellan Strategies was referenced in a Vail Daily article regarding survey research into support for public housing.
- Magellan Strategies was referenced in a Colorado Independent article regarding why Donald Trump lost Colorado.

=== 2016 election cycle ===
- Magellan Strategies staff was interviewed about the 2016 election in Colorado by FOX 31 Denver.
- Magellan Strategies data on Colorado millennial voters was referenced in an article in the Colorado Springs Gazette.
- Magellan Strategies Colorado surveys were referenced regarding Amendment 71 in a Colorado Independent article.
- Magellan Strategies Colorado early voting report is referenced in a U.S. News & World Report article about millennial voters.
- Magellan Strategies staff was interviewed by Megan Verlee of Colorado Public Radio regarding Colorado mail ballot returns.
- Magellan Strategies Colorado mail ballot return reports are cited in an article in the Los Angeles Times about early voting.
- Magellan Strategies survey of likely 2016 voters in Colorado regarding ColoradoCare and 2016 Colorado Amendment 69 was referenced in The Wall Street Journal.
- Magellan Strategies Staff is interviewed by The New York Times for an article regarding 2016 election and state legislative races.
- Magellan Strategies staff is interviewed by the Summit Daily newspaper regarding Colorado voter registration and voter turnout trends.
- Magellan Strategies survey is referenced in Denver 9News Congressional Debate, regarding 59% of Donald Trump supporters not voting for Republicans that do not support Donald Trump.
- Magellan Strategies survey of likely Colorado voters is referenced in a Denver Post article regarding Republican US Senate candidate Darryl Glenn.
- Magellan Strategies staff is referenced in a Denver Post article regarding Donald Trump and women voters.
- Magellan Strategies staff appeared on the PBS NewsHour with Gwen Ifill to provide commentary of the 2016 Presidential election in Colorado.
- Magellan Strategies survey of likely Colorado voters was referenced by the Denver Post regarding the findings for Amendment 70 to increase the minimum wage and Proposition 107 to bring back a Presidential primary.
- Magellan Strategies staff is interviewed by Lance Hernandez of Denver ABC News affiliate discussing the Iowa Republican presidential caucus and why Colorado will not get a lot of attention from the candidates.
- Magellan Strategies staff is quoted in a Politico article regarding the 2016 Presidential election in Pennsylvania.
- Magellan Strategies staff is interviewed by Colorado Public Radio regarding the growth of Libertarian and Green Party registration in Colorado.
- Magellan Strategies survey of likely Colorado voters was referenced by Townhall.com.
- Magellan Strategies survey of likely Colorado voters was referenced by Pueblo/Colorado Springs NBC affiliate KOAA.
- Magellan Strategies survey of likely Colorado voters was referenced by the Colorado Business Journal regarding Amendment 69 and other Colorado ballot measures.

=== 2015 Colorado legislative session ===
Magellan Strategies staff testifies in front of Colorado Senate Transportation Committee regarding Colorado voter opinion of a proposed $3.5 billion bond measure to fund transportation need in the state.

=== 2012 election cycle ===
In mid-November 2011, a Magellan poll conducted for the New Hampshire Journal reported that Newt Gingrich had surged in New Hampshire, which hosts the first Presidential nominating primary. The Magellan Poll reported that Romney had 29% support of surveyed voters while Gingrich was in a virtual statistical tie with 27%. By contrast, a Bloomberg News poll conducted less than a week before the Magellan Poll put Romney's support in New Hampshire at 40% and Gingrich at 11%. A story in The New York Times on December 16 reported "Signs of trouble emerged for Mr. Romney in New Hampshire on Nov. 18, the day a poll in The New Hampshire Journal showed for the first time that Mr. Romney and Mr. Gingrich were essentially tied.

=== 2011 election cycle ===
The Political editor of the Denver Post acknowledges Magellan Strategies for correctly predicting the outcome of the special election in New York's 9th Congressional District to replace Anthony Weiner.

=== 2010 election cycle ===
Magellan was criticized for making an inaccurate prediction that Tom Tancredo would win the 2010 Colorado governors election. Tom Tancredo lost to Democrat John Hickenlooper on election day, November 2. Hickenlooper resoundingly beat Tancredo by a margin of 51% to 36%. Editorial page editor Curtis Hubbard of The Denver Post gave Magellan his "Agony of Defeat" award for the worst poll in the gubernatorial race.
