= Tides: Pieces for Accordion and Piano =

Studio album by Jenny Conlee
- Released: March 24, 2023
- Studio: The Panther, Portland, Oregon, United States
- Genre: Contemporary classical
- Length: 34:07
- Language: English
- Label: Jealous Butcher

Tides: Pieces for Accordion and Piano is a 2023 studio album by American singer-songwriter Jenny Conlee.

== Recording and release ==
Tides is made up of two distinct sections: the first is a series based around Greek modes that reflect the nature of the Pacific Northwest and was written during a weekly residency in 2021. The second portion is a collection of various piano pieces, including "Looking Glass", a song written as a fundraiser for Twist Out Cancer.

== Reception ==
Editors at AllMusic rated this album 3.5 out of 5 stars, with critic James Christopher Monger writing this album shows Conlee's "most intuitive and enjoyable work to date". Writing for Portland Mercury, Ben Salmon notes that the first half "evokes a sense of melancholy for many people" and characterizes the second half "good companion pieces and nice palette cleansers".

== Track listing ==
All songs written by Jenny Conlee.

The Seaview Suite for Accordion

1. "Hawk (Dorian)" – 2:48
2. "Dune Grass (Lydian)" – 2:32
3. "Ocean (Mixolydian)" – 2:50
4. "Sand (Aeolian)" – 2:00
5. "Wind (Phrygian)" – 2:55
6. "Shell (Locrian)" – 2:52
7. "Sunset (Ionian)" – 2:40

Five Ostinatos for Piano

8. "Low Tide" – 3:25
9. "Pinwheel" – 2:29
10. "Sandpiper" – 2:13
11. "Looking Glass (For Tiffany)" – 4:29
12. "Shore Pine" – 3:00

== Personnel ==
- Jenny Conlee – accordion, piano
- Steve Drizos – engineering, mixing
- Rob Jones – design, layout
- NASHCO – front cover photography
- Jon Neufeld – mastering at Treehouse Mastering, Portland, Oregon, United States
- Jason Quigley – back cover photography

== See also ==
- List of 2023 albums
