= Monroe Monitor and Valley News =

The Monroe Monitor and Valley News
- "The voice of the Sky Valley"
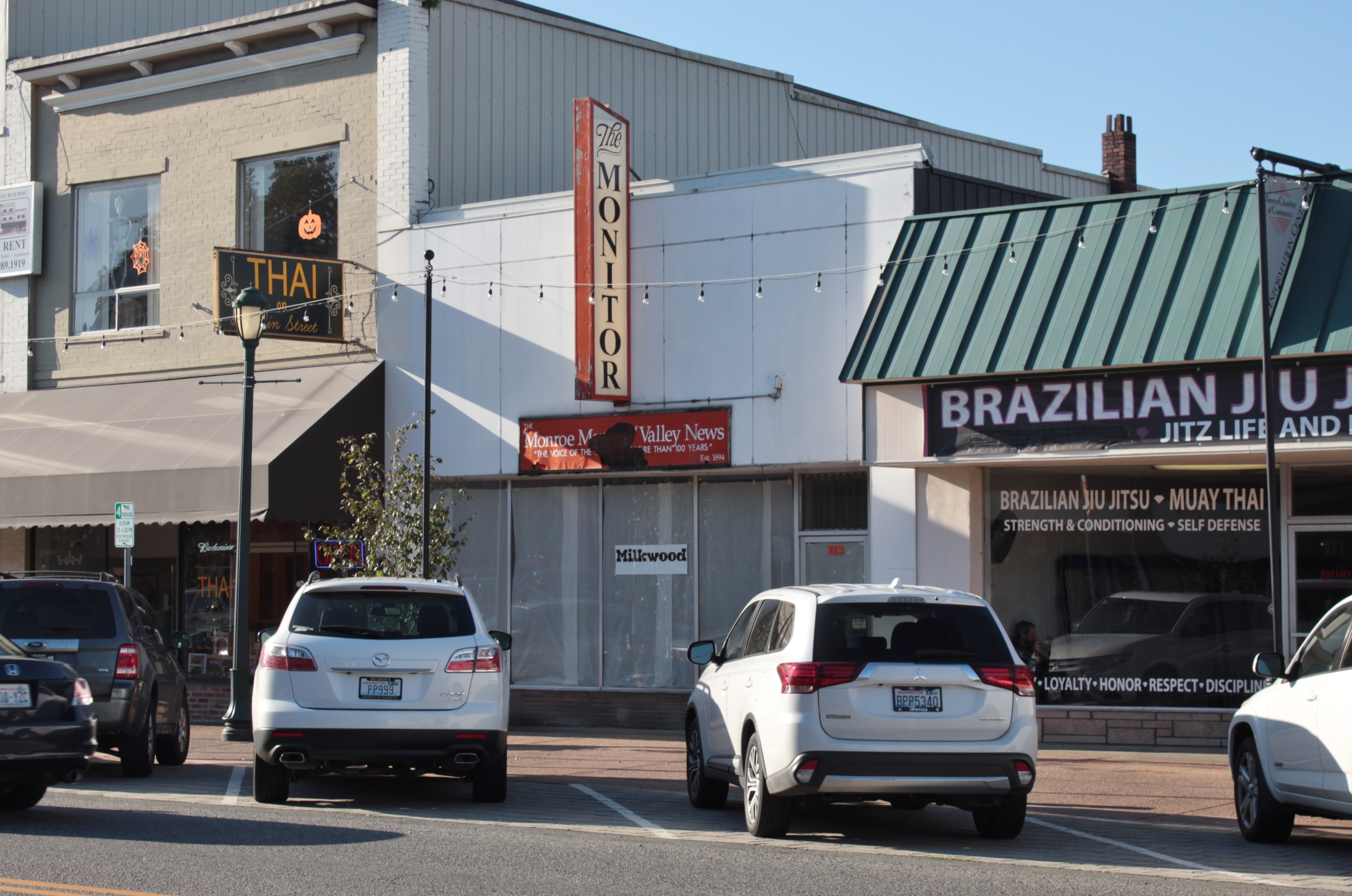
- A previous location of the offices of the Monroe Monitor and Valley News in Monroe, Washington on its Main Street
- Type: Weekly newspaper
- Owner(s): Pacific Publishing Company
- Founder(s): B. F. Smyth
- Founded: January 14, 1899
- Ceased publication: November 2021
- Website: monroemonitor.com

The Monroe Monitor and Valley News was a weekly newspaper published in Monroe, Washington, United States. It had an estimated circulation of 4,000 in 2013. It was also one of the first within the state.

== History ==
When B. F. Smyth founded the Monroe Monitor in January, 1899 it was the community's first newspaper. Since its inception, the newspaper had been continuous circulation. Following the successful development of the Monroe Monitor & Valley News, other weekly newspapers were born, only to quietly disappear or merge with the Monitor. Its first issue was published on Saturday January 14, 1899, and has had ten publishers throughout its duration. The paper was part of the penny press era, and subscriptions cost $1.00 per year. H. D. Matthews purchased the paper in 1908 and merged it with the Transcript, renaming the publication the Monroe Monitor-Transcript; "Transcript" was dropped from the title eight years later.

In the 1960s it was part of a consortium of five newspapers in Snohomish County that collaborated to produce a 12-page supplement.

The paper's final title was adopted in 1985 when then-owner Voland Publications acquired the Valley News from neighboring Sultan. (It was previously known as the Sultan Star.) Jerry Robinson of Seattle purchased the paper in 1993, and later sold it to RIM Publications. The paper was acquired in January 2015 by Pacific Publishing Company, which merged it with the Snohomish County Tribune in November 2021.

== Former names of the newspaper ==
- Monroe Monitor 1899 - 1909
- Monroe Monitor-Transcript 1909 - 1916
- Monroe Independent 1916 - 1917
- The Monroe Monitor 1917 - 1918
- Monroe Independent 1918 - 1919
- The Monroe Monitor 1919 - 1921
- Monroe Independent 1921 - 1924
- Consolidated with the Monroe Independent on January 5, 1923
- The Monroe Monitor 1924 - 1985 and then merged with Valley News in 1985.
