= Melissa A. Washington =

American executive

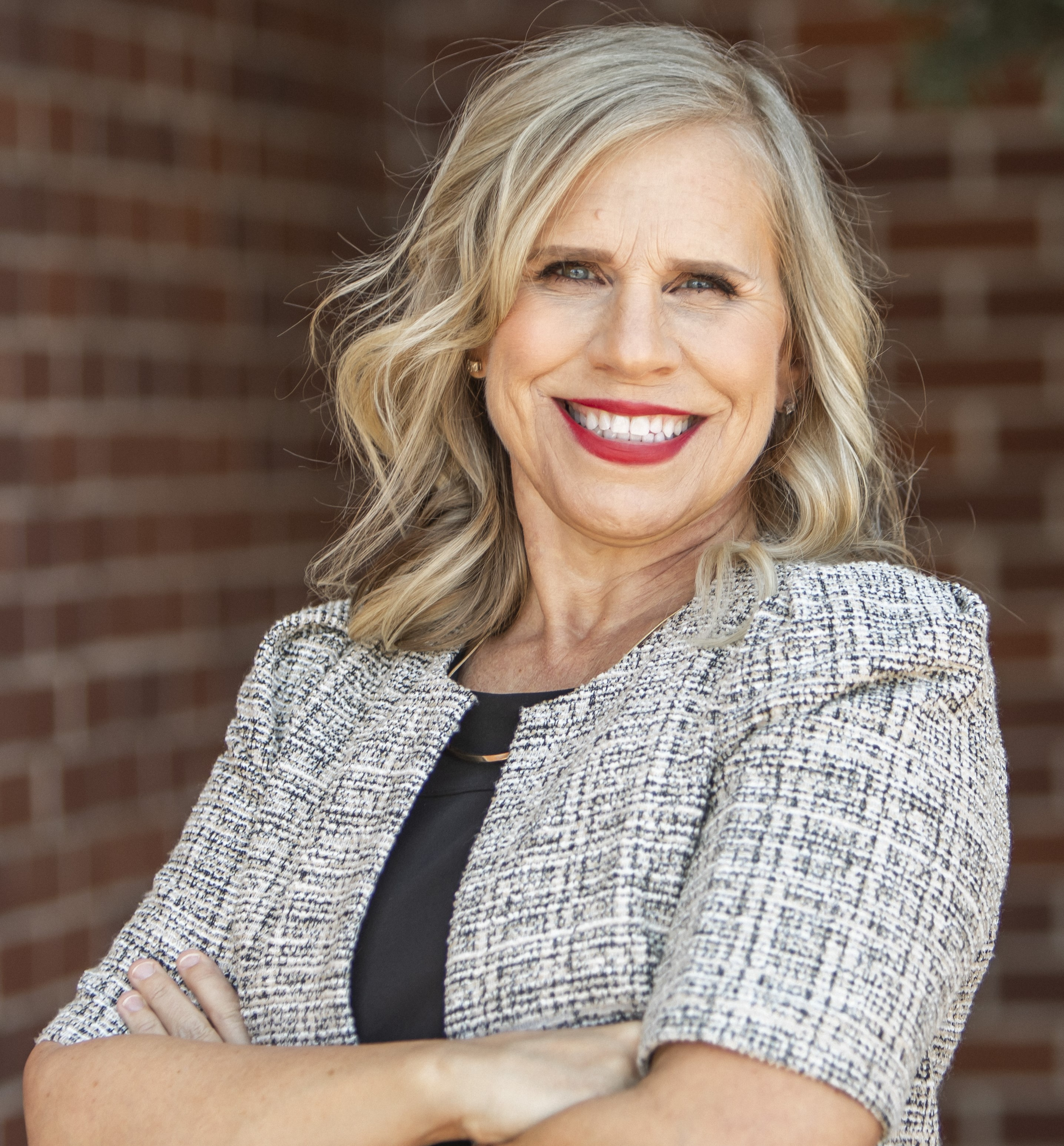
- Born: East Bay, California, U.S.
- Education: Bachelor of Science in Business Management & Marketting
- Occupation: Business Owner
- Known for: Founding Women Veterans Alliance
- Website: melissawashington.com

Melissa A. Washington is an American businesswoman, author, and United States Navy veteran. She is the founder of the Women Veterans Alliance (WVA), a United States–based organization that provides professional networking and career development programs for women veterans. She is also the founder of Melissa Washington Inc., a consulting firm that offers professional advisory services.

== Early life and military service ==
Washington was born and raised in the East Bay region of California. At age 18, she enlisted in the United States Navy. She served as a Storekeeper (SK) on active duty, managing orders, supplies, repair parts, and equipment. After her active duty stint, she transitioned to the Navy Reserve, where she continued to serve while pursuing her civilian career and education.

== Career ==
=== Corporate career ===
After completing her military service, Washington earned a bachelor's degree in business management and marketing. She worked in corporate recruiting and human resources roles for companies including Nissan, Oracle, and Randstad.

=== Women Veterans Alliance ===
Washington founded the Women Veterans Alliance in 2015 as a local networking group for women veterans in Sacramento, following her transition from military service to civilian life, as reported by the Sacramento Business Journal. The organization later expanded into global organization providing peer networking, mentorship, and professional development programs. By 2023, the WVA's work had been featured in regional and national media, including a feature on its expansion in the Sierra Sun, highlighting its expanded reach and resources.

== Authorship ==
Washington is the author of Get Back to Work: Smart & Savvy Real-World Strategies to Make Your Next Career Move (2014). She also contributed to Unstoppable: Being Fierce, Fearless & Unf*ckwithable in Life and Business (2022).

== Awards and recognition ==
Washington's advocacy has earned her several recognitions:

- She has been recognized by the U.S. Department of Veterans Affairs as a featured honoree in its "Veteran of the Week" program.
- In 2017, she was named a "Women Who Mean Business" honoree by the Sacramento Business Journal for her community impact.
- She was recognized with the Breaking Barriers feature by VA News in 2020 for her advocacy.
- She has also received industry awards from veteran-focused organizations, including being named "National Navy Veteran of the Year" by Military Friendly.

== See also ==
- Veterans' organization
