= Great Basin Sun =

Weekly newspaper published in Winnemucca, Nevada

- Type: Weekly newspaper
- Owner: Pacific Publishing Company
- Founder: Cal Sunderland
- Publisher: Peter Bernhard
- Managing editor: Jen Anderson
- Founded: 1972
- Language: English
- Headquarters: 1022 S. Grass Valley Road Winnemucca, NV 89445
- ISSN: 1082-2976
- OCLC number: 13775980
- Website: greatbasinsun.com

The Great Basin Sun is a weekly newspaper in Winnemucca, Nevada. It was founded in 1972 and preceded by The Silver State, Humboldt Star and Humboldt Bulletin. The Sun is a member of the Nevada Press Association, and a newspaper of record for Humboldt, Lander and Pershing counties.

== History ==
=== The Silver State, The Star and The Bulletin ===
In 1870, John C. Hall started the Silver State in Unionville, Nevada. The newspaper went through a number of owners. Peter Meyers and J.J. Hill moved the paper to Winnemucca and relaunched it in September 1874. George S. Nixon bought the paper in 1890 and sold it to the Winnemucca Publishing Co. in 1902. The paper was briefly known as the Winnemucca Republican and Daily Silver State until reverting back to The Silver State.

In January 1906, the Humboldt Star was founded by R.E.L. "Leo" Windle and George M. Rose. A.L. Brackett was a third partner in the firm. In December 1912, Rose retired. In June 1922, Rollin C. Stitser purchased Windle's half-interest, and in July 1923 bought out Brackett to become the Star's sole owner. In June 1925, Stitser's father leased the 50-year-old The Silver State of Winnemucca from Mrs. M.E. Graham and then consolidated it into the Star. The paper soon expanded into a daily. R.C. Stitser died in January 1939 from a brain tumor at age 39. His widow Avery D. Stitser then operated the paper. In October 1960, she sold it to Donrey Media Group.

In September 1961, Clayton Darrah founded the Humboldt County Bulletin with Pete Jenkins and Celso Cobeaga, who both were employed at the Star before it was sold. In July 1964, the paper expanded to a daily and was renamed to the Nevada Daily Bulletin. In December 1966, it returned to a weekly under the original name. In October 1967, Darrah purchased the Humboldt Star and Battle Mountain Scout from Donrey Media Group and then absorbed them into the Bulletin. In April 1969, Darrah leased the Territorial Enterprise from Dolores Schaefer and briefly published it as a localized edition of the Bulletin, but Darrah declined to buy the Enterprise and the deal lapsed after a year.

=== The Sun ===
In December 1971, Cal Sunderland and his wife Barbara moved to Winnemucca after agreeing to purchase the Humboldt County Bulletin from Clayton and Georgia Darrah. The deal fell through. In January 1972, the couple founded a rival paper called the Humboldt Sun. The Durrahs then sued the Sunderlands for $365,738 in response.

In April 1975, the Sun expanded from a weekly to a twice-weekly. In August 1975, Mr. Clayton died and the Bulletin at some point ceased. In May 1976, Cal Sunderland retired as editor and was succeeded by his son Michael K. Sunderland. In October 1977, the Sunderlands sold the Sun to Mark and June McMahon, while their son maintained a minority stake.

In 1995, the Sun expanded into a daily. In February 1998, the McMahons sold the Sun to Diversified Suburban Newspapers, a Utah-based company owned by William Dean Singleton and brothers Peter and Andy Bernhard. In 2005, Peter Bernhard acquired the Seattle-based Pacific Publishing Company and from then on operated the Sun under that business. In June, 2022, Bernhard announced the Winnemucca Humboldt Sun, Battle Mountain Bugle and Lovelock Review-Miner would be merged into a single publication called the Great Basin Sun.
