= Swift Communications =

Digital marketing and newspaper publishing company

Swift Communications Inc.
- Founded: 1975
- Founder: Philip E. Swift
- Headquarters location: 200 Lindbergh Dr, Gypsum, Colorado
- Owner: Ogden Newspapers
- Official website: swiftcom.com

Swift Communications Inc. is an American digital marketing and newspaper publishing company based in Carson City, Nevada. Swift's primary markets are resort town tabloid newspapers and websites as well as agricultural publications. The company was founded in 1975 by Philip E. Swift and acquired from estate by Ogden Newspapers in 2021.

== History ==
=== Origins and growth ===
Swift Newspapers was founded by Philip E. Swift in 1975. Swift, a former executive at the Scripps League of Newspapers, exchanged his equity interests in the company for ownership of two daily newspapers, The News-Review and Tahoe Daily Tribune. Swift also took possession of the Sierra Sun. In 1977, Swift acquired the Greeley Daily Tribune.

In January 1982, he merged his business with Pioneer Newspapers to form Swift-Pioneer Newspapers, Inc. In October 1982, the Lander Journal was acquired. In May 1983, Scripps-Ifft Newspapers, Inc., owned by Nicholas Ifft, sold the Bozeman Chronicle, Havre Daily News and Idaho State Journal to Swift-Pioneer. A few months later Swift-Pioneer also bought the Seaside Signal, Tillamook Headlight-Herald and The News Guard from Scripps-Ifft. In 1988, Swift-Pioneer acquired the Record-Courier.

Around 1990, Swift and Pioneer began operating separately, with Swift based in Carson City, Nevada and Pioneer based in Seattle, Washington. Pioneer took the papers in Idaho, Montana, southern Oregon and Washington, while Swift took the rest. Swift acquired the Vail Daily and Summit Daily News in 1993, the Nevada Appeal in 1995, followed by the Aspen Times and Glenwood Springs Independent in 1999. A year later Swift bought six papers from Morris Communications, including the Glenwood Springs Post, Rifle Citizen-Telegram, Valley Journal of Carbondale, Snowmass Village Sun and Eagle Valley Enterprise. The Post and Independent were merged to form the Glenwood Springs Post Independent.

Following the split with Pioneer, Swift took possession of Pacific Coast Newspapers, which published three papers on the Oregon coast. In February 2003, the subsidiary sold off the Seaside Signal, followed by Tillamook Headlight-Herald and The News Guard. Swift then purchased the Lahontan Valley News and Fallon Eagle Standard in October 2003, and The Vail Trail in February 2004. The company was renamed to Swift Communications in 2006, and acquired the Fort Collins Weekly in July 2007. The paper was renamed to Fort Collins Now.

=== Decline and sell off ===
Amid the Great Recession, Swift closed the Valley Journal of Carbondale, Spanish-language publication La Tribuna of Greeley and the Leadville Chronicle. In late 2008, Colorado Mountain News Media, a subsidiary of Swift, reduced its staff by 20% over a two-month period through attrition, retirement and layoffs. The Vail Trail also closed. Layoffs at Swift continued into 2009 with staff positions eliminated at the Grand Junction Free Press, The Citizen Telegram, The Post Independent and The Aspen Times. In July 2009, Fort Collins Now, was closed. In September 2009, P. William Toler was hired as CEO.

In 2015, Swift purchased the Park Record, sold The News-Review, and closed the Grand Junction Free Press. In 2016, Swift acquired the Steamboat Pilot & Today and the Craig Press. In July 2019, Swift Communication sold Nevada Appeal, the Lahontan Valley News, The Record-Courier and Northern Nevada Business View to Pacific Publishing Company.

On November 27, 2019, company founder Philip E. Swift died. In 2020, the company sold the Greeley Tribune to MediaNews Group. In December 31, 2021, Swift Communications was acquired by Ogden Newspapers, a Wheeling, West Virginia-based publisher of daily and weekly newspapers, magazines, telephone directories, and shoppers guides throughout 18 states. Company president Bob Brown then retired.

Following the sale to Ogden, Swift sold The Union to Gold Hill California Media in 2022, and Park Record to Tatiana and Matthew Prince in 2023. The company closed the Eagle Valley Enterprise of Eagle, Colorado, in 2025.

== Publications ==
Newspapers published by Swift Communications as of 2025.

=== California ===
- Sierra Sun
- Tahoe Daily Tribune

=== Colorado ===
- Craig Press in Craig, Colorado
- Glenwood Springs Post Independent in Glenwood Springs, Colorado
- Snowmass Sun in Snowmass Village, Colorado
- Sky-Hi News in Granby, Colorado
- Steamboat Pilot & Today in Steamboat Springs, Colorado
- Summit Daily News in Frisco, Colorado
- The Aspen Times in Aspen, Colorado
- The Citizen Telegram in Rifle, Colorado
- Vail Daily in Vail, Colorado

== Controversies ==
Swift Communications has been noted for "being outside of the mainstream" and "drawing national attention inside the industry" for disabling commenting and implementing paywalls on most of its online newspaper's websites.

=== Bob Berwyn firing ===
In November 2009 Bob Berwyn, a journalist for the Summit Daily News, wrote a column which criticized the marketing practices of Vail Resorts, one of the paper's largest advertisers. He was fired shortly after the writing the article. Berwyn claimed it was over his column, but the company claimed he was fired over “a series of events.” This firing was widely derided in the Colorado media.

"It's unfortunate but, especially in this economy, some advertisers feel like they can flex their muscles when there's commentary that they don't like," says Ed Otte of the Colorado Press Association. "Newspapers need to withstand these kinds of threats."

=== Removal of user comments ===
In May, 2011 after gathering analytics, metrics and revenue data on their commenting platform investment, Swift reviewed the data and decided to remove the user-generated content (UGC) platform Pluck from all online newspapers owned by Swift Communications. The ability for readers to leave comments about articles was removed. Editors with Swift felt the inability of their content management software to restrict comments they did not approve of was impacting newsroom productivity and civil community conversation.

Anthony Collebrusco from the Digital News Test Kitchen at CU-Boulder's School of Journalism & Mass Communication which is involved in researching a viable means of limiting the pseudonymity and unconditional free speech of commenters on Swift's websites paraphrased Swift's policy as:

"Executives at Swift concluded that resources should not be invested in comments — and therefore there is no rush to reinstate user comments — unless they can be made to generate revenue."

In Fall of 2011, the Aspen Times re-enabled anonymous commenting for users with an active Facebook account.

=== Inflated ad rates ===
Swift Communications has been accused of stifling competition and setting artificially inflated ad rates by consolidating and closing small-town newspapers. Steve Lipsher, former editor of the Summit Daily News said in 2008 that "If you're an advertiser in places like Summit County, they're the only game in town" and in 2009, Swift-owned newspapers had 90% market share in Eagle County. Swift has also been criticized for over-charging for obituary listings.

== See also ==
- Concentration of media ownership
- Online advertising
- Paid content
