= Lincoln County Record =

Weekly newspaper in Nevada

- Lincoln County Nevada's News Source
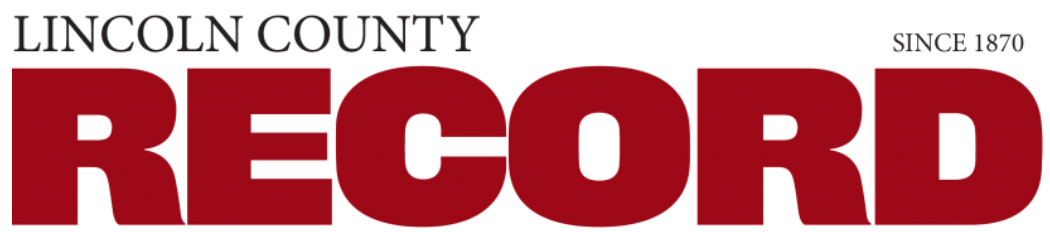
- The nameplate

- Caliente Depot on the front page of March 14, 2025
- Type: Weekly newspaper
- Owner: Ben Rowley
- Founder: H.R. Pitchford
- Publisher: Nevada Central Media
- Managing editor: Carly Sauvageau
- Staff writers: Collin Anderson, Jason Beam, Jessica Hernandez, Summer Mastin
- Former names: Ely Record (1870–1872); Pioche Daily Record (1872–1876); Pioche Tri-Weekly Record (1876–1876); Pioche Weekly Record (1877–1900); Lincoln County Record (1900–1905); Pioche Weekly Record (1906–1908); Pioche Record (1908–1925)
- Founded: 1870; 156 years ago
- Language: English
- Headquarters: Post Office Box 635; Alamo, Nevada 89001
- Circulation: 1,800
- ISSN: 8755-3260
- Website: lccentral.com

The Lincoln County Record is a weekly newspaper covering Lincoln County, Nevada. Originally founded as the Ely Record, it is the second oldest weekly newspaper in Nevada. The paper focuses on local stories to provide community journalism for the rural area.

== History ==
In September 1870, H.R. Pitchford founded the Ely Record newspaper in Ely and printed it out of a tent. Since then, the paper has used a number of locations as its headquarters, including Pioche, Caliente, and Panaca but has been based in Alamo as of 2025.

Patrick Holland was one of the paper's first proprietors with founder Pitchford. A few months later the paper was issued by Holland and Mr. Simpson. In August 1872, editor P. Frank Kenyon disposed of his interests, leaving Pat Holland as sole owner of the Record. Kenyon left to form a rival paper with W.B. Taylor called the Daily Pioche Review. That September, Holland expanded the paper into a daily and renamed it to the Pioche Daily Record.

In 1906, H.E. Freudenthal purchased the Record. Later that year he leased it to Eugene Goodrich and William Orr. In 1908, Lewis H. Beason, mining editor of the Deseret News, purchased the Record from Orr and Goodrich. Following Beason, the paper was acquired by Oliver R. Nation in 1918, A.A. Sherman in 1919, and Edgar L. Nores and F.E. Brown in 1920.

In June 1925, the Pioche Record and Caliente Weekly News were merged to form the Lincoln County Record. S.D. Perry was editor and manager. In 1949, a fire destroyed the paper's office. The paper continued publication without missing a deadline by using the presses of other nearby papers. Nores published the paper until his death in 1960.

Thomas L. Clay bought the paper about 1970 and ran it until his death in 1979. Connie Simkins was the editor from 1979 until retiring in 2008. In 2010, Stephens Media, owner of the Las Vegas Review-Journal, purchased the paper. In 2011, local reporter Rachel Williford won first place as a Journalist of Merit from the Nevada Press Association.

In 2012, the company sold the Record to Battle Born Media. In 2015, the UNLV University Libraries digitized and moved past issues of the paper online as part of the National Digital Newspaper Program. Battle Born planned to close the paper in 2020 due to the COVID-19 pandemic until long-term managing editor Ben Rowley purchased it. As of 2024, publishing legal notices provided about 35% of the paper's income.

== See also ==
- List of newspapers in Nevada
- History of American newspapers
