= Mike Keefe =

American editorial cartoonist (born 1946)

Mike Keefe (born November 6, 1946, in Santa Rosa, California) is an American editorial cartoonist best known for his work at The Denver Post, for which he drew cartoons from 1975 to 2011. His cartoons are nationally syndicated, and have appeared in hundreds of newspapers as well as in Europe, Asia, and most major U.S. news magazines. He last drew cartoons for The Colorado Independent, defunct as of 2020.

Keefe won the 2011 Pulitzer Prize for Editorial Cartooning.

A former mathematician and automobile assembly line worker, Keefe was educated at the University of Missouri–Kansas City and attended Stanford University on a journalism fellowship. He served in the United States Marine Corps and was president of the Association of American Editorial Cartoonists. Keefe was a juror for the 1997 and 1998 Pulitzer Prizes in Journalism. His awards include the Fischetti Award, National Sigma Delta Chi Gold Medallion, and the National Headliner Award.

Keefe is the author of three books: Running Awry, Keefe-Kebab, and The Ten-Speed Commandments. He plays guitar and harmonica for the rock & roll band Falling Rock.
