= Loren Jenkins =

American war correspondent (born 1939)

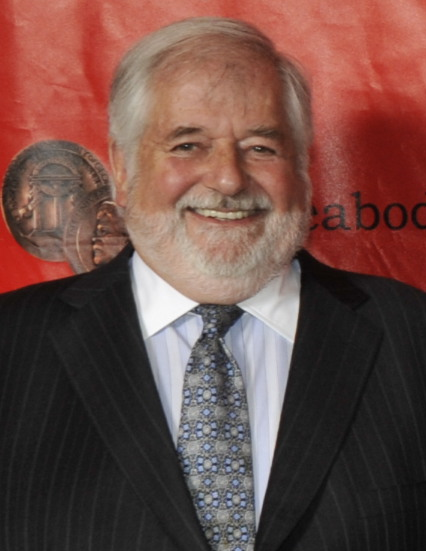
- Jenkins in 2011
- Born: 26 October 1938 (age 87); New Orleans, Louisiana, United States
- Education: University of Colorado (BA)
- Occupation: Journalist
- Known for: Reporting of the Israeli invasion of Beirut
- Spouses: Nancy R. Harmon (m. 1964; div. 1985); Laura Thorne (m. 1986; died 2021)
- Awards: Pulitzer Prize for International Reporting; Peabody Award

Loren Jenkins (born 26 October 1938) is a war correspondent for the Washington Post who won a 1983 Pulitzer Prize for International Reporting "for reporting of the Israeli invasion of Beirut and its tragic aftermath".

== Biography ==
Loren Jenkins was born in New Orleans into a family of American Foreign Service employees. He earned a bachelor's degree from the University of Colorado in Boulder at the end of the 1950s and then served with the Peace Corps in Puerto Rico and Sierra Leone. Jenkins returned to Aspen in 1964, where he worked as a ski instructor. He later continued his studies at Aspen University and did his graduate work at Columbia University in New York.

Jenkins got his first position as a reporter in 1964 with the Daily Item. After leaving the newspaper in 1965, he worked for United Press International in New York and as an overseas correspondent in London, Rome, and Madrid. From 1969 to 1979, Jenkins worked for Newsweek and covered Black September, the Suez Crisis, and the Vietnam War. His articles for Newsweek were honored with the Overseas Press Club Award in 1976.

In 1980, Jenkins joined the Washington Post staff. During his tenure with the newspaper, he was awarded the Pulitzer Prize for International Reporting in 1983 for his coverage of the Israeli invasion of Lebanon. At that time, the Washington Post was criticized for bias in covering the Israel–United States conflict. Marty Peretz, the famously pro-Israel owner of The New Republic, described Jenkins as "anti-Israel" and inane, stating that the journalist won a Pulitzer Prize because most of the judges subscribed to the Washington Post–Los Angeles Times news service.

In 1990, Jenkins returned to Colorado, where he assumed the editor position at the Aspen Times. In 1995, he was named an editor on the international desk at National Public Radio (NPR), where he worked for the next 15 years. Under Jenkins's leadership, correspondents of the radio station covered the wars in Kosovo, Chechnya, Iraq, and Afghanistan. In 2005, the international desk at NPR was awarded the George Peabody Award. In November 2011, Loren Jenkins retired but has continued to write as a freelancer.

== Books ==
- Brennan (1999). Who's who of Pulitzer Prize Winners. Westport: Greenwood Publishing Group. p. 666. ISBN 9781573561112.
- Friedman, Robert I. (1987). "Selling Israel to America". Journal of Palestine Studies: 1987.
- Fischer H. D. (2020). 1978–1989: From Roarings in the Middle East to the Destroying of the Democratic Movement in China. Vienna: Walter de Gruyter GmbH & Co KG. p. 379. ISBN 9783110862928.
