= Aspen Daily News =

American newspaper, founded 1978

- 'If you don't want it printed, don't let it happen."
- Type: Daily newspaper
- Owner: Hoffmann Media Group
- Founder: David Danforth
- Publisher: David A. Cook
- Editor: Andre Salvail
- Founded: 1978
- Language: English
- Headquarters: 315 E. Hyman Ave., Ste. 8
- Circulation: 14,500
- Website: aspendailynews.com

The Aspen Daily News is a 7-day-a-week newspaper in Aspen, Colorado, that started in 1978.

== History ==
In 1978, Dave Danforth, then working as a stringer for The Denver Post and some national publications, began printing up a one-sheet "missive" and distributing 2,000 copies around Aspen. "It was typewritten, both sides, with a little band of ads one inch high, a free handout," former Aspen journalist Andy Stone recalls. "He had a taste and a flair for sensational journalism."

The newspaper, which soon converted to a tabloid format on traditional newsprint, has had a competition over decades with The Aspen Times, founded as a daily in 1881 before converting to a weekly in the 1920s. In the face of The News' incursion, The Times introduced a daily edition beginning in 1988; as of 2016, The Times continues to publish daily.

The News proudly embraces its position as a muckraking, investigative newspaper with the motto: "If you don't want it printed, don't let it happen." The newspaper has not been without its own controversies, however. In 2003, the paper declared that it would stop covering the Kobe Bryant sexual assault case, which it regarded as over-covered and un-newsworthy, unless and until there was a verdict or settlement. In 2010, its editor was ousted following a DUI arrest when he implied he would give a police officer more favorable news coverage. Later in 2010, Danforth received a summons in the early morning of Oct. 9 for trespassing after he and a clerk at a local gas station allegedly argued about the tax on the purchase of a newspaper. "Police said he refused to leave the Locals Corner store around 2 a.m. when asked repeatedly by the worker and responding officers," the competing newspaper reported. Separately, a 2013 lawsuit accused Danforth of withholding funds from accounts tied to a building he owned with a fellow business partner.

In 2015, the newspaper moved to 2,000 square feet of offices in a building on Main Street where the Stage 3 movie theater once stood. In 2017, Dave Danforth sold the paper to a former manager and local investors. In 2025, David Cook and Spencer McKnight sold the paper to Hoffmann Media Group.
