= Steamboat Pilot & Today =

Newspaper published in Steamboat Springs, Colorado

- Front page on Sunday June 14, 2009.
- Type: Daily newspaper
- Format: Tabloid
- Owner: Swift Communications
- Founder: James Hoyle
- Editor: Lisa Schlictman (2013–2021); Brent Boyer (2007–2013)
- Founded: 1885 (Pilot); 1927 (Today)
- Language: English
- Headquarters: 32 10th Street; Steamboat Springs, Colorado 80477
- Country: United States
- Circulation: 9,099 (as of 2009)
- Sister newspapers: Craig Press
- OCLC number: 82453875
- Website: www.steamboatpilot.com

The Steamboat Pilot & Today is an American newspaper serving Routt County, Colorado, and owned by Swift Communications. It is a free tabloid published daily. As of 2011, the Steamboat Pilot & Today has been named the top newspaper in its circulation class eight times in nine years by the Colorado Press Association.

== History ==
On July 31, 1885, James Hoyle published the first edition of The Pilot in Steamboat Springs, Colorado. On December 4, 1894, Hoyle died. His widow then took over as manager. In June 1896, John Weiskoph and Charles H. Leckenby purchased the paper.

In March 1897, Leckenby left the Pilot and purchased the Yampa Valley Democrat. That June, Leckenby and Bruce A. Burgess bought the Pilot from Weiskoph and consolidated the two papers. That October, Burgess exited the firm. In 1909, Delavan W. Gee became co-owner, but in 1918 Leckenby bought him out.

In 1927, Leckenby bought The Routt County Sentinel and absorbed it into the Pilot. In 1929, the paper was incorporated as a stock company called Steamboat Pilot Inc. In 1944, Leckenby acquired The Oak-Creek Times-Leader and absorbed it into the Pilot.

In 1950, C.H. Leckenby died after running the paper for over five decades. His son Maurice W. Leckenby succeeded him as publisher, and ran the Pilot until his death in 1963. His son, Charles J. "Chuck" Leckenby, sold the Pilot in 1988 to Jack Kent Cooke, a multi-millionaire who owned the Washington Redskins and Los Angeles Daily News.

On August 21, 1989, The Steamboat Today, a daily tabloid newspaper, was first published an accompaniment to the Pilot. In 1991, Chuck Leckenby retired as publisher. In 1994, WorldWest LLC, a company owned by the Simons family who published the Lawrence Journal-World, acquired the Pilot, the Today and several other papers from the Cooke family's Raljon group.

On Jan 28, 2001, the Pilot moved publication from Wednesday to Sunday and merged with the Today to form the Steamboat Pilot & Today. In June 2016, the newspaper was acquired by Swift Communications. In November 2019, company founder Philip E. Swift died. In December 2021, Swift Communications was acquired by Ogden Newspapers. In May 2024, the Pilot & Today announced it will cease publishing a print edition on Mondays.
