= Sierra Sun =

Weekly newspaper published in Truckee, California

- Type: Weekly newspaper
- Owner: Swift Communications
- Founder(s): D.B. Frink; Edward Willis Hayden
- Publisher: Rob Galloway
- Editor-in-chief: Laney Griffo
- Founded: 1871 (as the Grass Valley Republican)
- Language: English
- City: Truckee, California
- Sister newspapers: Tahoe Daily Tribune
- Website: sierrasun.com

The Sierra Sun is a weekly newspaper in Truckee, California.

== History ==
On November 9, 1871, D.B. Frink and Edward Willis Hayden published the first edition of the Grass Valley Republican in Grass Valley, California. After about six months, they relocated their printing plant to Truckee, a less competitive market, and relaunched the paper as the Truckee Republican on April 30, 1872.

Hayden sold out to Frink operated the paper until he was fatally shot by a vigilante movement called "The 601," which stood for 6 feet under, zero trial, one bullet or one rope. Hayden then operated the Republican until Frink's estate sold it to B.T.K. Preston and W.F. Edwards in December 1874.

General Charles Fayette McGlashan purchased the Republican in December 1875. He went on to become a noted historian of the ill-fated Donner Party and later owned the Santa Barbara Press. The Republican was acquired by B.J. Watson in May 1880, McGlashan again in December 1884 after returning from Santa Barbara, Willard P. Calkins in July 1893, F.M. Rutherford and Charles M. Ryan in December 1896, and Calkins again in 1903. The Calkins Newspaper Syndicate declared bankruptcy in 1909 and the Republican was sold at auction to Walter E. Dorn for $2,005.

At some point W.H.M. Smith became editor. He was known as a crusader against saloons and gambling, and, in 1911, was fined $150 for allowing gambling at the Whitney Hotel, which he owned. In 1912, Smith was shot by merchant P.M. Doyle, owner of the Truckee electrical power plant. The two had been feuding for weeks and got into a fight outside the post office. Smith died from his injuries and Doyle was put on trial for murder. Later that year the Republican was acquired by Bert Alford Cassidy, whose brother-in-law A.E. Falch owned the Placer County Republican in Auburn.

Cassidy sold the paper to Cecil Edmunds in 1923. A fire destroyed the paper's office building in June 1926. Edmunds sold the paper to Ralph Kingman in 1928. Edmunds went on to organize the Truckee Utility District. In 1929, the paper's co-founder Hayden died. In 1931, John J. Holden sold the Republican to Stanly Bavier. A year later Bavier made a request to the Attorney General of California to investigate the Nevada City board of supervisors for discrimination over not opening bids for government notices and relying only on the Grass Valley Union.

In August 1933, Bavier changed the paper's name to the Sierra Sun. Bavier died in a car crash that same month. His widow Elizabeth Bavier operated the Sun for a few years and then sold it in 1936 to Walter M. Barrett, formerly of Woodland Mail. Barrett published the paper for three decades until he sold it in 1967 to Scripps League Newspapers. In 1968, former owner McGlashan was posthumously inducted into the California Newspaper Hall of Fame.

In 1975, Philip E. Swift exchanged his interests in the company for ownership of the Tahoe Daily Tribune and The News-Review. He also took possession of the Sierra Sun. Over the years the Tahoe World and North Lake Tahoe Bonanza were absorbed into the Sun. In 2021, Swift Communications was acquired by Ogden Newspapers.
