= Tahoe Daily Tribune =

Weekly newspaper published in South Lake Tahoe, California

- Type: Weekly newspaper
- Owner: Swift Communications
- Founder(s): Frank and Mary Chase
- Publisher: Rob Galloway
- Editor: Laney Griffo
- Founded: 1958
- Language: English
- Headquarters: 3079 Harrison Avenue; South Lake Tahoe, CA 96150
- Sister newspapers: Sierra Sun
- OCLC number: 38873736
- Website: tahoedailytribune.com

The Tahoe Daily Tribune is a weekly newspaper in South Lake Tahoe, California.

== History ==
On June 26, 1958, the first edition of the weekly Tahoe-Sierra Tribune was published by Frank and Mary Chase. It was a pennysaver printed in Sparks, Nevada and edited by "Basil "Ben" Benedict. About three months after launch, W.T. "Bill" and Evelyn Heseman, owners of the El Dorado Logging Company, joined the enterprise and built a plant at Al Tahoe. A Duplex flatbed press was installed and the plant opened in March 1959.

The Hessemans soon bought out the Chases. Lyle L. Laughlin became published in October 1959. In November 1959, the paper expanded from printing once to five days a week. The expansions into a daily resulted from a $50,000 capital investment from the Hessemans. Zane Miles took over as editor in November 1959.

In April 1961, Heseman appointed Neal Van Sooyas, formerly of the Nevada Appeal, as editor and publisher. Around that time the paper's name was changed to the Tahoe Daily Tribune. In July 1962, W.T. "Bill" Heseman retired and hired Vern Shomshak to succeed him. A month later Heseman sold the Tribune to George B. Thornhill, who in September 1963 sold it to Scripps League Newspapers. In 1975, Philip E. Swift exchanged his interests in the company for ownership of the Tribune and The News-Review.

On April 16, 2007, the Tribune went from a paid, broadsheet newspaper to a free, tall-tab format. In 2021, Swift Communications was acquired by Ogden Newspapers.
