= Portland Mercury =

Alternative weekly newspaper published in Portland, Oregon

- Type: Alternative bi-weekly
- Format: Tabloid
- Owner: Brady Walkinshaw
- Publisher: James Deeley (November 2025-)
- Editor: Wm. Steven Humphrey
- Founded: June 2000
- Language: English
- Headquarters: 115 SW Ash St., Suite 600; Portland, OR 97204; USA
- Circulation: 45,000 (as of June 2014)
- Website: portlandmercury.com

Portland Mercury is an alternative bi-weekly newspaper and media company founded in 2000 in Portland, Oregon. It has a sibling publication in Seattle, Washington, called The Stranger.

== History ==
A prior version of The Mercury was published from 1869 and into the 1930s. The current Portland Mercury launched in June 2000. The paper describes their readership as "affluent urbanites in their 20s and 30s." Its long-running rivalry with Willamette Week began before its first issue was even printed when Willamette Week publisher Richard Meeker asked a Portland law firm to pay $10 to register the Mercury name with Oregon's Corporation Division, thus preventing it from being used for 120 days.

As of 2020, the newspaper's revenue was almost entirely dependent on advertising and sales of tickets for events and concerts with nearly 95% of its revenue coming from advertisements.

Former managing editor Phil Busse's controversial tenure included charges of plagiarism, a favorable review for a restaurant that hadn't yet opened, a bid for mayor, and a cover featuring him wearing women's underwear, dollops of whipped cream, and a hard hat. Shrill, a television series based on Seattle-based writer Lindy West’s memoir and essay collection of the same name, was inspired by The Stranger and Portland Mercury and starred actress Aidy Bryant. The paper has also published articles and columns written by Chuck Palahniuk and Dan Savage.

Portland Mercury's print edition was published weekly until fall 2018 when it changed to bi-weekly beginning with the issue released on September 13, 2018. Its name as displayed on the nameplate was shortened to just Mercury as well.

On March 14, 2020, during the COVID-19 pandemic, the paper temporarily suspended print publication and switched to online only. In addition, it laid off 10 employees, which comprised half of the publication's staff. A special newsstand edition, titled 'Say Nice Things About Portland: A Manifesto,' was released in May 2023. It was Portland Mercury's first print publication since the beginning of the pandemic.

In July 2024, the paper, along with the related The Stranger were sold by Index Media to Noisy Creek, a media company founded by Brady Walkinshaw.
