= The Aspen Times =

Daily newspaper in Aspen, Colorado, United States

- Type: Daily newspaper
- Owner: Swift Communications
- Founder(s): George F. Crosby; Edwin O'Connell; G. Lavelle
- Publisher: Sarah Girgis
- Editor-in-chief: River Stingray
- Founded: 1881
- Language: English
- Headquarters: 534 E. Hyman Ave. Aspen, Colorado, 81611, U.S.
- Circulation: 6,500
- Sister newspapers: Glenwood Springs Post Independent
- OCLC number: 13179962
- Website: aspentimes.com

The Aspen Times is a daily newspaper in the ski resort town of Aspen, Colorado, United States, with a history dating back to 1881.

== History ==
On April 23, 1881, the first edition of The Aspen Times was published. It was founded by George F. Crosby, Edwin O'Connell and G. Lavelle. Soon Josh C. Connor bought a quarter interest. By October 1882, Lavelle had sold his stake back to the firm and O'Connell and Connor were also looking to exit the business. At that time Crosby acquired sole ownership, saving the Times from closure.

In March 1883, Davis Hanson Waite became proprietor and editor, followed in October by B. Clark Wheeler, who was his son-in-law and later remembered as "the Father of Aspen" due to his efforts promoting the town's development. In February 1885, Wheeler expanded the paper from a weekly into a daily.

On Aug. 6, 1900, C.B. Pash published the first edition of a rival paper called The Aspen Democrat. C.J. Lincke succeeded Pash as editor, followed a month later by Charles Daily. In June 1909, Daily acquired the Times and merged his two papers together to form The Aspen Democrat-Times. In 1926, the paper was renamed back to the Times. In 1927, the paper reverted back to a weekly.

In 1934, after 33 years of ownership, Daily sold the Times to Hugh B. Thompson, who in 1936 resold it to Roger Nowviskie. In 1939, Lawrence Kurtz, who managed the paper's mechanical department, and former owner Thompson, who was now based in Helena, Montana, and working for the Associated Press, bought the Times. Thompson was then named company president while Kurtz became editor. In 1941, Kurtz was promoted to publisher, a position previously left vacant after Nowviskie's departure.

=== William Dunaway ===
The Times was acquired by Roy A. Williams in 1942, Verlin E. Ringle in 1944, and William R. "Bil" Dunaway in 1956. Previously, Dunaway was managing editor of Skiing Magazine and a U.S. Army 10th Mountain Division veteran during WWII. He was an avid skier who would spend the next 38 years managing the paper. In that time, he'd own several media ventures and expand the Times into a daily. He his career earned him an induction into the Aspen Hall of Fame, alongside B. Clark Wheeler, a previous publisher.

==== Daily Times ====
In 1965, Dunaway installed an offset printer at the paper's office. In 1973, Nick Pabst was promoted to editor, but left a year later. In 1974, prices were increased from 15 cents to 20 cents a copy. In 1981, a business section was added with Bill Rollins as business editor. In 1986, prices were raised again to 35 cents a copy. In April 1988, KSNO news director Dave Price resigned to work as a reporter at the Times. Later that year Dunaway on Nov. 9 expanded the Times from a weekly to a daily, with Price as editor. It became a direct competitor of the Aspen Daily News.

==== Peggy Clifford ====
In 1954, Peggy Clifford and Robert Craig revived the Aspen Flyer, a mimeographed newspaper. Shortly after taking ownership on the Times in 1956, Dunaway hired Peggy Clifford as managing editor and helped her transform the Flyer into quarterly publication aimed at tourists. In 1959, George W. Madsen Jr., became co-owner and editor of the Flyer. It was around that time Clifford stepped down as managing editor, but she continued to write several columns for the Times. Clifford worked at the paper for 12 years. She would go on to produce four PBS documentaries and author four books, including “To Aspen and Back."

==== Radio & Television ventures ====
In 1962, Dunaway formed a company that would bring five metropolitan television channels to town through via microwave and cable. The company would be called Canyon Cable TV Corp., with Dunaway as its president. In 1964, Dunaway co-founded KSNO-FM. In January 1967, Canyon Cable TV completed work on its four-station microwave link to Smuggler Mountain. In May 1967, Dunaway sold the Sage to the owners of the Glenwood Springs Morning Reminder, and the two papers merged to form the Sage-Reminder. In 1969, Canyon Cable TV was sold to Columbia Cable Systems, Inc. In 1973, Dunaway stepped down as manager of Canyon Cable TV. In 1977, Dunaway co-founded the radio station KGLS. In 1978, he sold off KSNO. In 1979, KGLS became KMTS. In March 1988, Dunaway acquired and KGLN.

==== Other print publications ====
In 1959, Dunaway launched the weekly Glenwood Springs Sage. In 1960, Dunaway purchased the weekly Rifle Telegram. In 1971, Dunaway became co-owner of Climbing Magazine. In 1974, Michael Kennedy was named Climbing editor. In 1978, Dunaway acquired the Carbondale Valley Journal.

In 1988, Dunaway sold Climbing to Kennedy. In 1989, Dunaway sold the Telegram and Valley Journal to Thomas Griffin. In 1990, Griffin declared bankruptcy and ownership of the two weeklies reverted back to Dunaway. At that time, Dunaway sold the Valley Journal to a consortium of Journal employees, and sold the Telegram to the owners of the West Valley Citizen, and the two papers merged to form the Citizen Telegram.

=== Loren Jenkins ===
In February 1992, Loren Jenkins, who a decade prior won the Pulitzer Prize for International Reporting while reporting for The Washington Post, assumed the role of publisher and editor. Dunaway and Jenkins had reached an agreement giving him the option to buy the paper after two years. Jenkins filled the paper with more national and international stories. Several staffers left after he published exposés on local officials and wealthy residents. In June 1992, Jenkins refused a request by the local county attorney to reveal the sources for a controversial story on a reprimanded building department official.

In June 1994, Jenkins was the lead member of a group of five papers that bought the Times from Dunaway. The other owners were George Stranahan, John McBride, and Angela and Jeremy Foster. After disagreements among the others owners, Jenkins was fired in October 1995. Andy Stone was then placed in charge as editor-in-chief. The ownership group soon expanded to a group of nine investors owning stock the venture, called Full Court Press. In February 1998, the Times launched a second paper called the Glenwood Independent. In June 1999, co-owner Michael McVoy said the group was looking to sell.

=== Swift Communications ===
In November 1999, Swift Communications acquired the Times and the Independent. In November 2000, Swift bought six papers from Morris Communications, including the Glenwood Springs Post, which was merged with the Independent to form the Glenwood Springs Post Independent. In 2005, the paper's historic building at 310 E. Main St. which it occupied for 100 years was sold for $2.3 million. In 2012, the Times to 314 E. Hyman Ave. In March 2019, the paper's website was redesigned. In December 2019, company founder Philip E. Swift died, and in 2021 the newspaper chain was acquired by Ogden Newspapers. Allison Pattillo was named publisher in 2022, followed by Sarah Girgis in 2025. Later that year, editor-Ray Erku was fired.

==== Doronin controversy ====
On April 13, 2022, Vladislav Doronin, an international real estate developer and art collector, who was involved in a real estate development at the entrance to the Aspen Mountain ski area, sued Swift Communications for defamation with respect to the newspaper's coverage and characterization of Doronin. The legal action was settled by confidential agreement and dismissed May 27, 2022. During the pendency of the suit, coverage of Doronin was suspended by the publisher. Tension over the matter resulted in firing of the editor, Andrew Travers. Travers sued The Times, Ogden and Swift Communications in 2023 for breach of contract, promissory estoppel (breaking of a promise), negligent misrepresentation and intentional misrepresentation (accidental and knowing fraud). Travers also had claimed relief for wrongful discharge but removed that claim in an amended complaint filed in November. The suit was settled out of court in January 2025.
