= The News-Review =

Daily newspaper published in Roseburg, Oregon

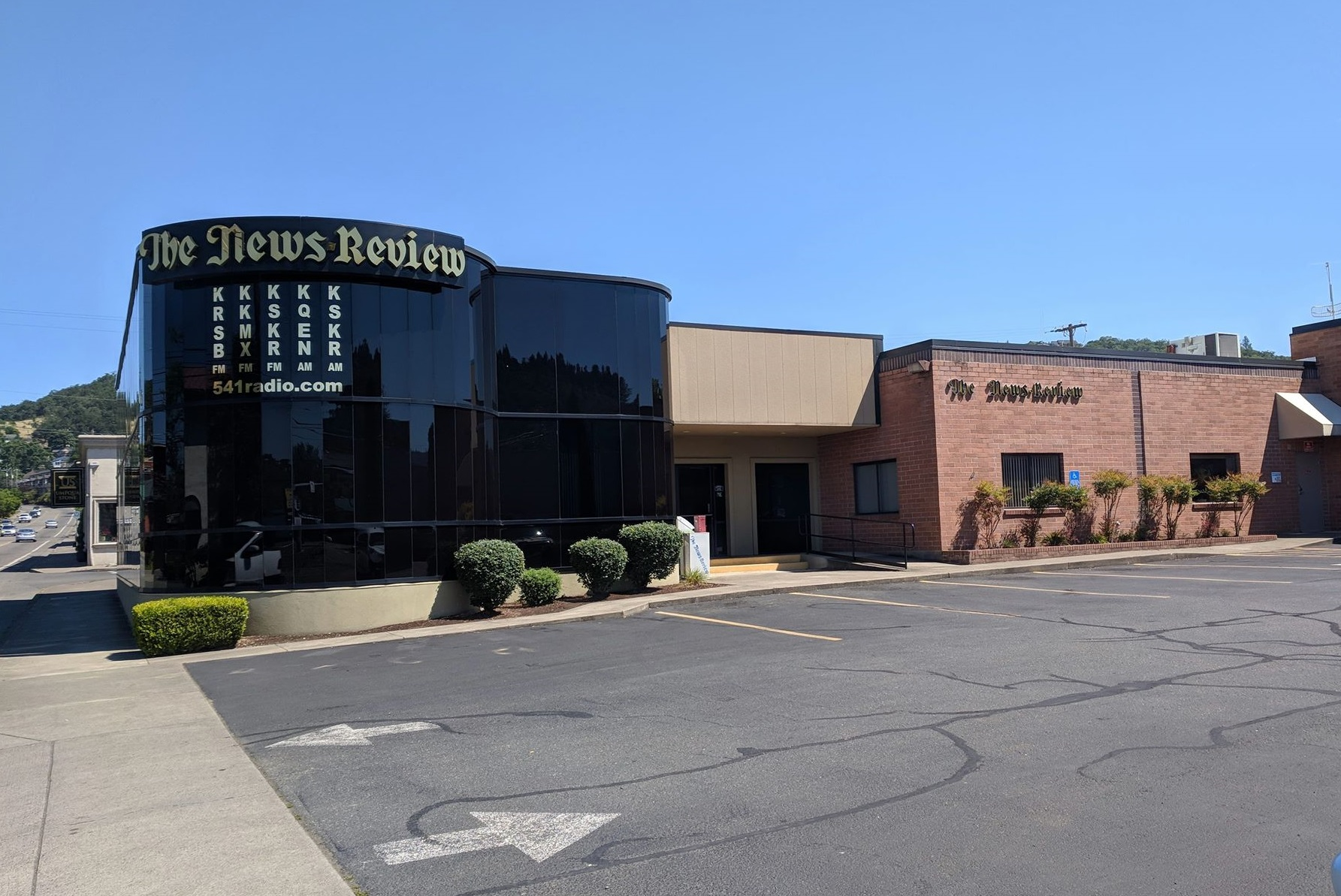
- Type: Weekly newspaper
- Owner: Patrick Markham (Lotus Media Group)
- Founder(s): Thomas and Henry Gale
- Managing editor: Drew Winkelmaier
- News editor: Erica Reynolds
- Founded: April 30, 1867 (as The Roseburg Ensign)
- Language: English
- Headquarters: 345 NE Winchester St., Roseburg, OR 97470
- Circulation: 7,615
- Website: nrtoday.com

The News-Review is weekly community newspaper published in Roseburg, Oregon, United States. The circulation area covers all of Douglas County including Roseburg, Canyonville, Glide, Myrtle Creek, Oakland, Sutherlin, and Winston.

== History ==
=== Origins ===
The Roseburg Ensign was the original predecessor of The News-Review. It was founded Thomas and Henry R. Gale, two brothers from Eugene, on April 30, 1867. The first issue of the four-page weekly came out on May 28 for the price of $3. In September 1871 their newspaper plant was destroyed in a fire and would resume publication on January 6 the next year.

=== The Plaindealer ===
The Republican Gales were bitter rivals of southern Democrat William "Bud" Thompson, the publisher and owner of The Plaindealer. Thompson's paper was founded in March 1870 after he had sold his Eugene City Guard in Eugene for $1,200. That same year Democrat La Fayette Grover was elected Governor of Oregon, ending an eight-year run of Republican governors. The new government favored The Plaindealer with lucrative public-notices. This escalated tensions between the two papers.

=== Roseburg Newspaper Shootout ===
The inciting incident occurred when one Saturday Thompson ran into Thomas Gale at the post office. Reports on what happened vary. Thompson writes in his memoir that Thomas Gale tried to draw a pistol, but Thompson grabbed his hand and slapped him in the face. However, newspaper accounts report Thompson spat in Gale's face and slapped him. Bystanders quickly separated the two before a full-on brawl could develop and Thomas Gale stormed off.

Two days later as Thompson was stepping out of his office, he was confronted by the Gale brothers in downtown Roseburg on June 11, 1871. Newspapers report the encounter started with Thompson apologizing to Thomas for spitting in his face, which was not accepted. Reports conflict on what happened next. Thompson writes of the event in his memoir, writing:

“... Success was not attained without gaining the enmity and bitter hatred of my would-be rivals in business. Theirs was an old established paper conducted by two brothers, Henry and Thomas Gale. . . They sought to regain (business) by indulging in abuse of the coarsest character. . . June 11, 1871, I went to my office. ...to write my letters...on leaving the office I was joined by a young friend, Mr Virgil Conn. As we proceeded down the street towards the post office I saw the brothers standing talking on the street. . . I saw at once it was to be a fight. . .”

It is unknown who fired the first shot. All three were wounded in the shoot-out, but none killed. Thompson, age 23 at the time, was wounded in the neck and with a bullet lodging in the back of his eye. Henry Gale was seriously wounded. Having never fully recovered from the incident, he would die in 1889. Thompson sold his paper in February 1872 to L. F. Mosher and would go on publish the Salem Mercury. Mosher sold the Plaindealer in 1873 to William H. Byars, who quickly converted it from a Democratic to Republican paper and published it for about 10 years. (Byars was elected State Printer in 1883, about the time he bought 50% of the Oregon Statesman, which he co-owned for about 18 months; in 1888, Byars bought Salem's Capital Journal newspaper.)

=== New name and ownership change ===
The Ensign was sold to R. Tyson and renamed to The Pantagraph in 1872. In April 1875, the paper was renamed to the Douglas Independent under the ownership of John W. Kelley. In 1885 the paper was sold again to former Confederate soldier Rev. John Richard Newton Bell. He renamed the paper to the Roseburg Review and converted it from a weekly to a daily newspaper on May 9, 1888. Bell was a Democrat and used the paper to express his political opinions.

=== Merger ===
The Plaindealer became the Umpqua Valley News in 1905 and merged with the Roseburg Review in 1920 to form The News-Review. Frank Jenkins bought the paper in 1930 and sold it to Scripps League Newspapers in 1960. Phil Swift of Swift Communications acquired The News-Review after the Scripps League broke up in 1975. It was at this time the paper added a Sunday edition, bringing the paper to a 6 day-a-week publication. The Saturday issue was discontinued in November 2020.

=== Lotus Media ===
In September 2015, the paper was purchased from Swift by Patrick Markham and his company, Lotus Media Group. Markham is the president of Brooke Communications, owner of five Roseburg radio stations. In January 2024, a ransomware attack targeting Lotus Media Group resulted in the newspaper's staff getting locked out of email and other software programs used to produce the paper. In October 2024, the newspaper switched from carrier to postal delivery. In July 2025, the News-Review decreased it's print schedule from five to one day a week. The paper announced it would cease operations in April 2026 and print its final paper on April 24.
