= The Union (newspaper) =

Newspaper in Grass Valley, California, US

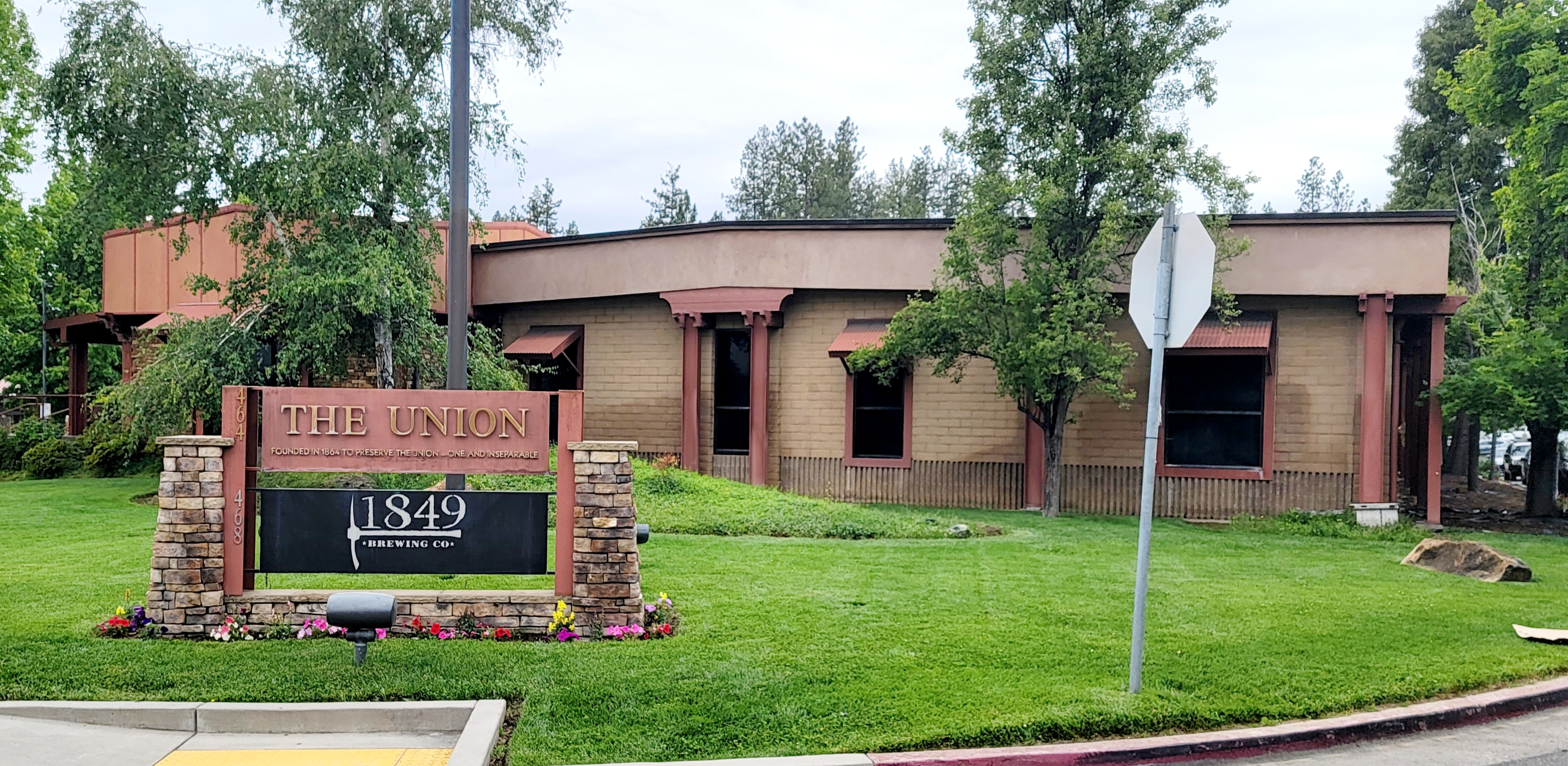
- The Union offices in 2022
- Type: Daily newspaper
- Owner: Gold Hill California Media
- Founder(s): Jim Townsend; Henry Meyer Blumenthal
- Publisher: Scott Conley
- Editor: Nathan Levinson
- Founded: October 28, 1864; 161 years ago
- Language: English
- Headquarters: Grass Valley, California United States
- Circulation: 10,000+
- ISSN: 1050-7906
- OCLC number: 21613794
- Website: theunion.com

The Union is a daily newspaper serving Grass Valley and Nevada County, California. It provides news coverage of the local and regional level. Sections include news, sports, opinion, entertainment, and more. The paper has a daily print circulation of over 14,000 copies and also publishes an online edition.

== History ==
The Union began publication as the Grass Valley Daily Morning Union on October 28, 1864. Jim Townsend and Henry Meyer Blumenthal founded the paper to support the Union cause and the re-election of Abraham Lincoln during the Civil War.

Although the paper was founded for the purpose of supporting Lincoln's candidacy, Townsend immediately tried to sell the venture to a rival newspaper that supported the candidacy of George B. McClellan, Lincoln's Democratic Party rival. Blumenthal ousted Townsend and continued supporting Lincoln. The day before the election, a group of men led by John Rollin Ridge went to the offices of the newspaper and assaulted Blumenthal. One report states that Ridge committed the assault. In the 21st century, the newspaper identifies Blumenthal as the founder of the newspaper. Every issue in later years has carried the motto "Founded in 1864 to Preserve The Union - One and Inseparable."

Charles H. Mitchell became the owner around 1867. He published the paper for close to three decades until selling it to William P. Calkins and James C. Tyrrell in March 1893. A few months later William F. Prisk purchased the paper on June 13, 1893. Under his leadership, The Union became the first “country” newspaper in California to become an Associated Press wire service affiliate. The Union incorporated in 1906. Thomas Ingram started working for the paper in the 1890s as an apprentice in the printing department and worked his way up to managing editor. The Ingram family purchased the newspaper in 1946.

Scripps League Newspapers bought the paper in 1967. Pioneer Newspapers split off from Scripps in 1975 and took the Union with it. Pioneer merged with Swift Newspapers in 1982 and the Union eventually came under the management of Swift Communications. In November 2021, Ogden Newspapers acquired Swift, and then sold the Union in June 2022 to Gold Hill California Media.

== Delivery ==
The Union was a morning paper since 1864 until switching to evening delivery in 1945. It switched back in 1999. In March 2024, the newspaper announced it was switching from carrier to postal delivery.

== Headquarters ==
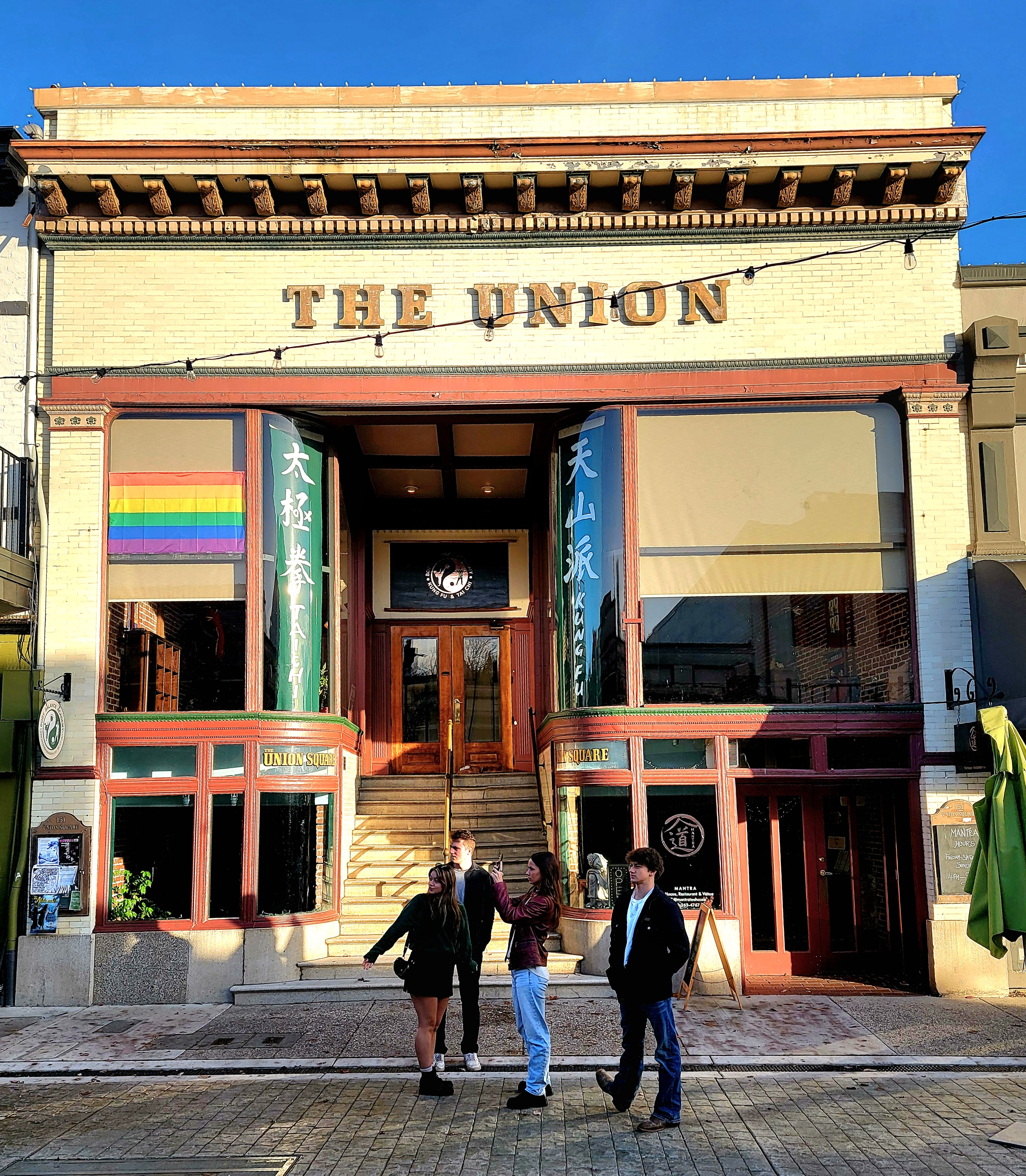
The Union office location from 1906 to 1978

In 1906, The Union moved down the street from its original location at the southwest corner of Mill and West Main streets to "The Union", a building at 151 Mill Street, Grass Valley. In 1978, the paper moved from downtown to its current location at 464 Sutton Way, Grass Valley.
