= Pahrump Valley Times =

Newspaper based in Pahrump, Nevada

- Type: Weekly newspaper
- Owner(s): Las Vegas Sands
- Founder(s): Milton Bozanic
- Founded: December 23, 1971; 53 years ago
- Language: English
- Headquarters: 1570 E. Highway 372, Pahrump, Nevada 89048, United States
- OCLC number: 14924916
- Website: pvtimes.com

The Pahrump Valley Times is a bi-weekly printed newspaper and online news site in Pahrump, Nevada, that covers news regarding Pahrump as well as areas around Nye County. The newspaper started its circulation on December 23, 1971, and has continued to offer printed editions for its subscribers since. Its online news site was launched in the early 1990s, and an electronic edition of its printed newspaper followed in early 2020. Pahrump Valley Times is currently affiliated with the Las Vegas Review-Journal publication group.

== History ==
The newspaper was founded in 1971 by Milton Bozanic, who previously established other publications such as Casino Post and the Las Vegas Home Magazine. It was originally a monthly newspaper when it was first delivered to the public before it began following a weekly publication schedule in 1976. In 1981, Bozanic acquired another newspaper in Pahrump, the Pahrump Valley Star – and the newspaper name reflected this change by becoming Pahrump Valley Times-Star, before eventually returning to its original name. Around eight years later, Bozanic would sell his ownership stake in Pahrump Valley Times to Joe Thurlow and his son Richard Thurlow. Richard served as publisher and editor for over a decade. It was during Thurlow's leadership that the Pahrump Valley Times started building its online presence in the 1990s. The Thurlows also bought and ran the Pahrump Valley Press and the newspaper started circulating twice-weekly, instead of just once weekly. Not long after that, the newspaper was acquired by Stephens Media and is currently owned by the Las Vegas Sands Corporation.

== See also ==
- Las Vegas Review-Journal
- List of newspapers in Nevada
