= Glenwood Springs Post Independent =

Colorado daily newspaper

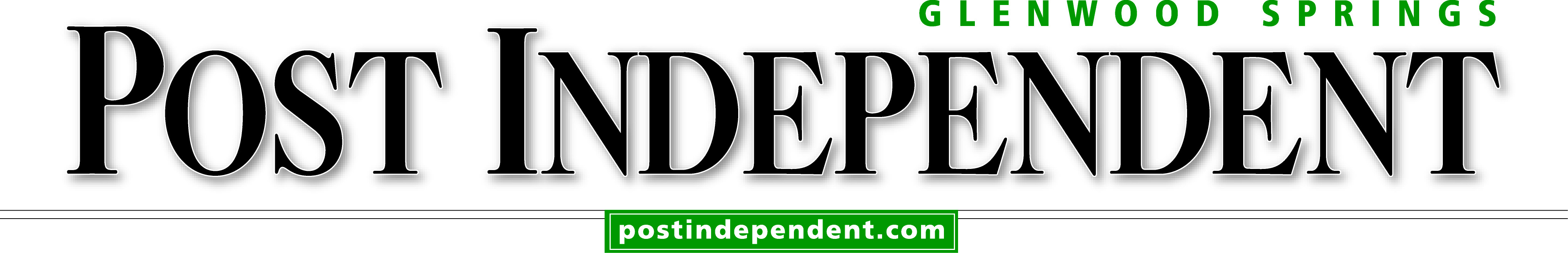
- Type: Free daily newspaper
- Owner: Swift Communications
- Founded: 2000
- Website: postindependent.com

The Glenwood Springs Post Independent is a daily newspaper distributed in Garfield County, Colorado. The publication covers the municipalities of Glenwood Springs, Carbondale, New Castle, Silt, Rifle and Parachute.

The paper was created in November 2000, by the merger of the historic Glenwood Post and Glenwood Independent, and is owned by Swift Communications of Carson City, Nevada. The publication is a member of the Colorado Press Association.

== History ==
In 1997, the owners of The Aspen Times founded the Glenwood Springs Independent. Both papers were sold in 1999 to Swift Communications. A year later the company purchased the Glenwood Springs Post from Morris Communications and merged it with the Independent to form the Glenwood Springs Post Independent. In 2005, the word "Glenwood" was dropped from the paper's name.

In 2017, Post Independent staffers found photo negatives featuring the notorious American serial killer Ted Bundy that were kept in an old safe at their Glenwood Springs office since the 1970s. The negatives show Bundy at the Garfield county jail, and scenes from the search for him after he escaped from both the Pitkin and Garfield county jails.
