= 2018 Idaho Proposition 2 =

Proposition 2
- Medicaid Expansion Initiative

Results
Choice	Votes	%
Yes	365,107	60.58%
No	237,567	39.42%
Total votes	602,674	100.00%

Yes
90–100%
80–90%
70–80%
60–70%
50–60%
No
90–100%
80–90%
70–80%
60–70%
50–60%
Other
Tie
No votes

2018 Idaho Proposition 2 is an approved ballot initiative that was included on the 2018 general election ballot on November 6, 2018. Idaho's Proposition 2 is an initiative which addressed the proposed Medicaid gap within the state. This Ballot Initiative was approved and qualified to be included for voting on July 17, 2018, through campaigning and petitioning for signatures to acquire the necessary support of the voting Idaho population to be included for state-wide voting through the 2018 General Election ballot. This initiative moved to expand Medicaid to persons who did not previously qualify. Proposition 2 would expand Medicaid coverage to persons under the age of 65 if their income is below 133% of the Federal Poverty Line (FPL) and are unable to gain medical insurance or coverage through other means.

The estimated amount for Medicaid expansion in Idaho is 105 million dollars. Many studies have found that in total expansion states have saved around 6.2 billion dollars in uncompensated care between 2013 and 2015.

== Campaign and supporters ==
A grassroots canvassing drive was held in order to gain enough signatures of registered voters in the prerequisite number of legislative districts in order to place the proposition on the ballot for the 2018 midterm elections. The drive was able to successfully obtain the needed number of signatures, a total of 56,192 signatures in at least 18 of the 35 state's legislative districts, and by the end of the drive over 70,000 signatures were collected.

Within the campaigning and petitioning portion to gain access to this proposition being listed on the election ballot, there were many officials and organizations that supported this Medicare expansion and worked to help gain the necessary support to allow this topic to be added onto the 2018 General Election voting Ballot in Idaho. Medicaid expansion was supported by many officials, among the supports was the Democratic gubernatorial candidate Paulette Jordan. There were two major committees that supported Proposition 2 and played a large role within the campaigning and petitioning to get enough support to warrant Proposition 2 onto the 2018 General Election Ballot were the Idahoans for Healthcare and Reclaim Idaho. Together the committees managed to raise nearly two million dollars in support of the proposition.

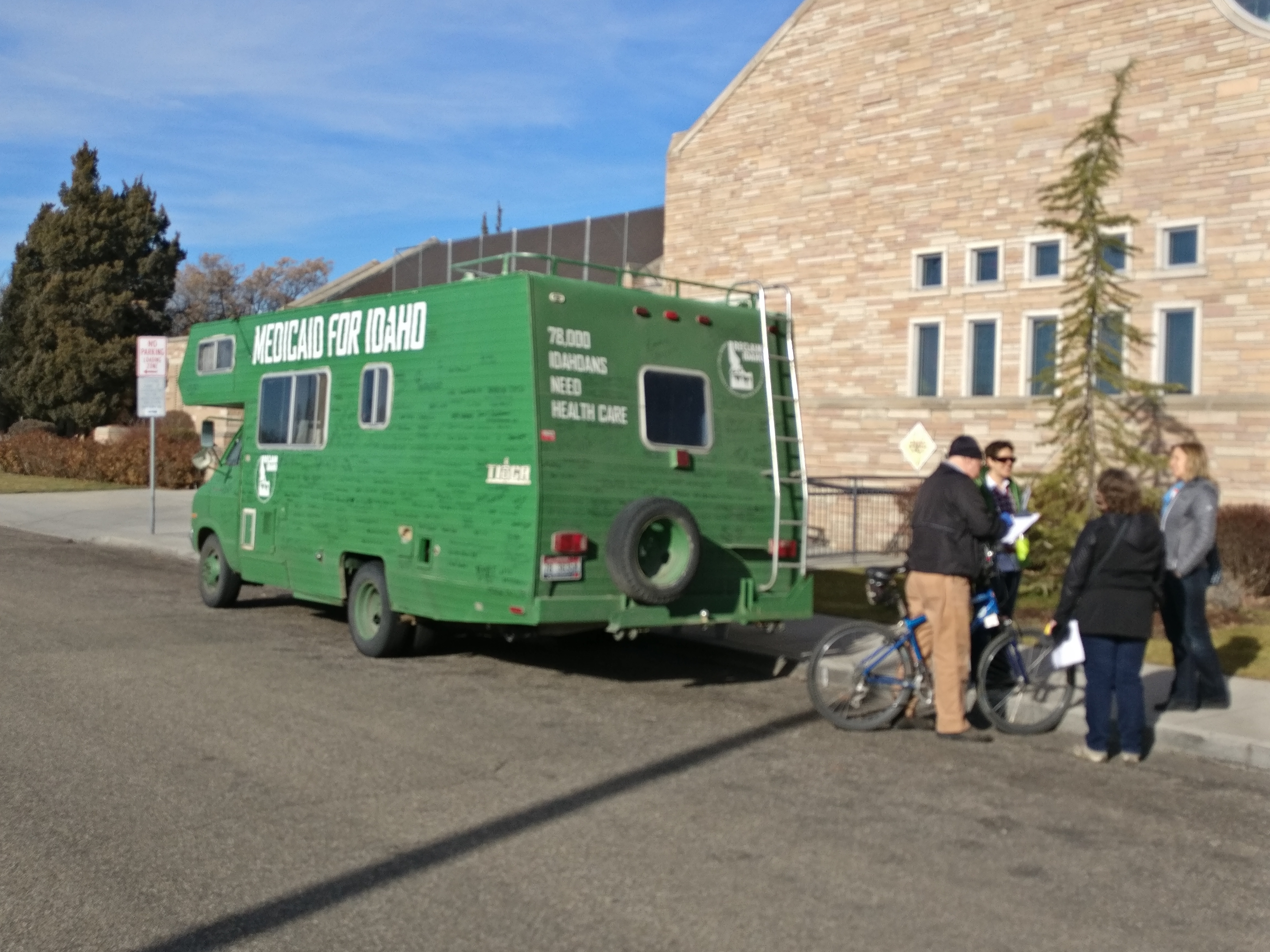
The Medicaid For Idaho van is a symbol of the campaign. "78,000 Idahoans Need Health Care." Here canvassers coordinate outside of the Methodist Cathedral of the Rockies.

There were also many persons and organizations that did not support Proposition 2, primarily the newly formed political action committee Work, Not Obamacare PAC, an offshoot of the Idaho Freedom Foundation.

== Proposition ==
The proposition was designed to address the Medicare gap that existed within the state by expanding Medicaid eligibility. The full text of the ballot read:

"Be It Enacted by the Legislature of the State of Idaho:

SECTION 1. That Chapter 2, Title 56, Idaho Code, be, and the same is hereby amended by the addition thereto of a NEW SECTION, to be known and designated as Section 56-267, Idaho Code, and to read as follows:

56-267. MEDICAID ELIGIBILITY EXPANSION. (1) Notwithstanding any provision of law or federal waiver to the contrary, the state shall amend its state plan to expand Medicaid eligibility to include those persons under sixty-five (65) years of age whose modified adjusted gross income is one hundred thirty-three percent (133%) of the federal poverty level or below and who are not otherwise eligible for any other coverage under the state plan, in accordance with sections 1902(a)(10)(A)(i)(VIII) and 1902(e)(14) of the Social Security Act.

(2) No later than 90 days after approval of this act, the department shall submit any necessary state plan amendments to the United States Department of Health and Human Services, Centers for Medicare and Medicaid Services to implement the provisions of this section. The department is required and authorized to take all actions necessary to implement the provisions of this section as soon as practicable."

== Voting ==
County results

Approximately 66.8% of the 612,536 registered voters that turned out for the November 6th, 2018 General Election voted on Proposition 2. The results were in favor for the proposition, with 60.6% of voters supporting and 39.4% opposing.

== Alteration ==
This initiative was later modified to include requirements for Medicaid recipients to meet further qualifications to gain eligibility for the expanded program through the establishment of Senate Bill 1204. The official legislation in regards to this Senate Bill can be found here.

This alteration added requirements to ensure working hours, education hours, volunteerism, or qualification in programs such was TANF or SNAP to gain access to the expanded Medicaid benefits. The Legislative Alteration verbiage is listed below:

“ Legislative alteration:

Senate Bill 1204 was passed in the state legislature on April 5, 2019, and signed by the governor on April 9, 2019. SB 1204 was designed to require Medicaid recipients to do the following:

1.Work at least 20 hours per week or earn wages equal to or greater than the federal minimum wage ($7.25 per hour as of 2019) for 20 hours per week or participate;

2. Participate in a work training program for 20 hours per week;

3. Be enrolled at least half-time in postsecondary education or other education program;

4. Satisfy the work requirements with a combination of working, volunteering,

or participating in a work program for 20 hours per week; or

5. Comply with the requirements of the work programs under the temporary assistance for needy families (TANF)

or supplemental nutrition assistance program (SNAP).

SB 1204 includes some exemptions for the work requirement.”

== Implementation ==
The proposition passed with 60.6% of the vote. However, was challenged in court in a lawsuit directly after the initiative was passed within the 2018 General Election.

There has been one lawsuit in regards to Proposition 2, since it was approved through the 2018 General Election. This lawsuit was: Brent Regan v. Idaho Secretary of State Lawerence Denney and was filed within the Idaho Supreme Court. The Plaintiff, Brent Regan, made the argument that through the passing of Proposition 2, the initiative violates the constitutional right of the state and the Medicaid expansion within Idaho delegates too much power to the Federal Government. This case was found to be ruled in favor of the Defendant, Idaho Secretary of State Lawerence Denney. The court ruled that Regan's concerns were based within the hypothetical and the judiciary branch was not the appropriate mediary at this time. The courts stated within their case report conclusion section that the voting results have proven the voice of the people within the State and it is now within the hands of the legislative branch of government. The case that Regan has proposed is not a constitutional issue and has been brought to the attention of the courts prematurely.

== Current status ==
ACA Medicaid expansion by state. Not adopted Adopted Implemented

Since the events of Proposition 2 being passed, there are currently 36 states in which Medicaid has been expanded within due to voter initiatives in each state. As of 2019, there are still 14 states which have not passed medicare expansion initiatives. Through the Medicaid expansion efforts it is reported to have increased yearly coverage for persons earning up to 138% of the Federal Poverty Level.

The success of the campaign has been noted as an example of rural conservative voters voting for liberal measures.
