= Vail Daily =

Newspaper in Vail, Colorado

- Type: Free daily newspaper
- Format: Tabloid
- Owner: Swift Communications
- Founder(s): Jim Pavelich; Jon Van Housen
- Publisher: Mark Wurzer
- Managing editor: Krista Driscoll
- Founded: 1981
- Language: English
- Headquarters: 40780 US Hwy 6 & 24; Avon, Colorado 81620
- Country: United States
- Website: vaildaily.com

The Vail Daily is a newspaper in Eagle County, Colorado first published in 1981. Its primary digital platform is VailDaily.com, and it also publishes a 15,000-circulation, free-distribution newspaper seven days a week. The newspaper covers the Colorado communities of Vail, Avon, Edwards, Beaver Creek, and Minturn, the area ski resorts, and greater Eagle County.

== Publishers ==
On June 15, 1981, the first edition of The Vail Daily was published. It was founded by Jim Pavelich and Jon Van Housen with $3,000 in tip money as a successor to the recently defunct Vail Daily Mail. At that time, The Daily was a competitor of the Vail Trail. After a few years, Pavelich bought out Van Housen.

In 1992, Pavelich refused to run an ad from a gay man in The Daily. The ad advocated for a boycott of Colorado in response to the passing of the 1992 Colorado Amendment 2. In 1993, Pavelich sold The Daily and the Summit Daily News to Swift Communications. In 2021, the company was acquired by Ogden Newspapers.

In 2025, The Daily became the newspaper of record for Eagle County following the closure of the Eagle Valley Enterprise.
