= Snohomish County Tribune =

Weekly newspaper published in Snohomish, Washington

- Type: Weekly newspaper
- Owner: Pacific Publishing Company
- Publisher: Becky Reed
- Editor: Michael Whitney
- Founded: June 28, 1892; 133 years ago
- Headquarters: 605 Second St., Suite 224; Snohomish, Washington, U.S.
- Circulation: 2,100 (as of 2022)
- OCLC number: 17359892
- Website: snoho.com

The Snohomish County Tribune is a weekly newspaper based in Snohomish County, Washington. It is owned by Pacific Publishing Company.

== History ==
The predecessor to the newspaper was the Snohomish Weekly Sun, which first came off the presses in the summer of 1888 with George W. Head as editor and manager. The paper transitioned to daily publication in July 1889.

The Sun was sold to W.M Sanger in 1892 and became a Republican-oriented tri-weekly. The paper's name was changed to Snohomish County Tribune on July 28, 1892. Ownership changed multiple times over the years, but its longest reign of single ownership was under Thomas E. Dobbs, who bought the paper in 1922 and owned it for 33 years.

In 1955, the newspaper was bought by Bill Bates, Willis Tucker, and Don Berry after Dobbs died unexpectedly at his desk. Tucker was co-owner of the paper for eight years before selling his shares and leaving to go work at The Everett Herald.

By 1969, Bill Bates and Edward Wise, who became a co-owner sometime after 1972, expanded the Tribune printing plant by adding an off-set press, and founded the Snohomish Publishing Co. Bates retired as publisher in 1981 and sold his interest in 1983. The company's newspaper division was sold to Tribune publisher Dave Mach in 1986 while the printing operation remained under the ownership Snohomish Publishing Co.

In 1995, Edward Wise sold Snohomish Publishing Co. to Dana Best and his son Jeff Wise and retired as the company's president in 1996. The company came under the complete ownership of Dana Best and his wife Kelli Best in 2007 who continued to operate the press until closing it on November 14, 2014.

At some point after 2020, the newspaper was sold by David H. Mach, who owned it under the Mach Publishing Company, to Pacific Publishing Company.

== See also ==
- List of newspapers in Washington (state)
