= Pacific Publishing Company =

American commercial printer and newspaper publisher

- Founded: 1990
- Founder: Tom Haley
- Headquarters location: 636 South Alaska Street, Suite E2 Seattle, Washington 98108
- Owner: Peter Bernhard
- Official website: pacificpublishingcompany.com

The Pacific Publishing Company is a Seattle-based commercial printer and newspaper publisher. The company publishes newspapers in Washington and along with Great Basin Sun in Nevada and Nevada Rancher magazine.

== History ==
Houston media executive Tom Haley and five other investors formed Pacific Publishing Company (PPC) in 1990 to purchase the assets of 14 newspapers in King County, Washington with a combined circulation of 126,000 and 135 employees. From John Murray, owner of Murray Publishing Company, PPC purchased the Queen Anne News, Magnolia News, Masonic Tribune, The Issaquah Press, The Issaquah Valley Shopper and Argus Weekend. From John Flaherty, owner of Flaherty Newspapers, PPC purchased the Beacon Hill News, Capitol Hill Times, University Herald, The North Central Outlook, The Mercer Islander, Madison Park Times, South District Journal and Seattle's Police Beat.

In 1995, PPC sold The Issaquah Press to The Seattle Times Company. The paper closed in February 2017 after publishing more than 6,000 editions over 117 years.

By 2000, PPC had nine publications with a combine total circulation of 90,000 and employed 43 full-time workers and eight part-timers.

In 2005, Haley sold PPC to Peter Bernhard, who owned several community newspapers in Nevada.

In January 2007, PPC sold The Kirkland Courier to King County Publications, a subsidy of Sound Publishing, and it was renamed to The Kirkland Reporter. PPC originally purchased The Kirkland Courier in 1992, which at that time was a free weekly newspaper with a 17,000 circulation.

PPC ran into financial difficulty during the global Great Recession of 2007–2009, selling the Capitol Hill Times in July 2009 to Washington Legal Journal, a legal notice publisher.

In January 2012, PPC shut down its South Seattle Beacon and North Seattle Herald-Outlook community newspapers.

PPC reacquired the Capitol Hill Times on Jan. 1, 2015 from RIM Publications, the publishing wing of the foreclosure services company that took it over from PPC in 2012. PPC also acquired RIM's last two remaining Washington papers: the Monroe Monitor and Valley News and The Eatonville Dispatch.

The Capitol Hill Times, founded in 1926, ceased as of 2020. A year later The Monroe Monitor, founded in 1899, was merged into the Snohomish County Tribune in November 2021.

=== Nevada News Group ===
Nevada News Group is a division of PPC operating in Nevada. Prior to 2022, Nevada News Group published six community newspapers along with a business publication and a ranching magazine.

On Aug. 1, 2019, PPC acquired the assets of four publications from Sierra Nevada Media Group: the Nevada Appeal in Carson City, The Record-Courier in Gardnerville, the Fallon Lahontan Valley News and the Northern Nevada Business View in Reno. Nevada News Group was to operate these papers along with the other titles it published at the time: the Winnemucca Humboldt Sun, Battle Mountain Bugle, Lovelock Review-Miner, Fallon and Fernley Mailbox News, and Nevada Rancher magazine.

On June 15, 2022, Owner/Publisher Peter Bernhard announced the Winnemucca Humboldt Sun, Battle Mountain Bugle and Lovelock Review-Miner would be merged into a single publication called the Great Basin Sun. Bernhard attributed this to the February 2022 closing of Press Works Ink, a printing press in Carson City owned by Ogden Newspapers that printed all of PPC's Nevada newspapers. As a result of the press closure, PPC moved the printing of its Nevada newspapers out of state to Wesco Graphics in Tracy, California.

In January 2025, PPC sold Nevada News Group to Eagle Valley Publishing. The sale included the Nevada Appeal, The Record-Courier, the Lahontan Valley News and Northern Nevada Business Weekly. PPC retained ownership of Great Basin Sun in Winnemucca and Nevada Rancher magazine.

== Commercial Printing ==
PPC's Commercial Web Printing Division was first started within Murray Publishing in 1976. The facility is located near downtown Seattle at 636 S. Alaska Street, in SoDo near Georgetown. Pacific Publishing maintains two lines of cold-set web press operating 24 hours a day six days a week.

== Newspapers ==
Newspapers owned by Pacific Publishing Company
State	Service area	Newspaper	Website
Washington	South Pierce County	The Dispatch	dispatchnews.com
Washington	Madison Park, Seattle	Madison Park Times	madisonparktimes.com
Washington	Queen Anne & Magnolia, Seattle	Queen Anne & Magnolia News	queenannenews.com
Washington	Everett, Monroe and Snohomish	Snohomish County Tribune	snoho.com
Nevada	Carson City	Nevada Appeal	nevadaappeal.com
Nevada	Gardnerville	The Record-Courier	recordcourier.com
Nevada	Carson City	Fallon Lahontan Valley News	nevadaappeal.com/news/lahontan-valley
Nevada	Winnemucca	Great Basin Sun	greatbasinsun.com
Nevada	Reno	Northern Nevada Business Weekly	nnbw.com
