= Elko Daily Free Press =

Daily newspaper published in Elko, Nevada

- Type: Daily newspaper
- Owner: Lee Enterprises
- Founder: C.H. Sproule
- Founded: 1883
- Language: English
- Headquarters: 875 Railroad St., Elko, NV 89801, US
- Circulation: 6,776 Daily (as of 2023)
- OCLC number: 13457689
- Website: elkodaily.com

The Elko Daily Free Press is a newspaper in Elko, Nevada, United States.

== History ==
On January 5, 1883, C.H. Sproule published the first edition of the Elko Free Press. E.M. Steninger bought the paper in 1910. The Steninger family sold the paper in 1999, to Liberty Group Publishing, who resold it in 2004 to Lee Enterprises.
