= Record-Courier (Nevada) =

Newspaper published in Gardnerville, Nevada

The Record-Courier
- Type: Twice-weekly newspaper
- Owner: Adam Trumble
- Founder: A. C. Pratt
- Founded: 1875; 151 years ago
- Language: English
- City: Gardnerville, Nevada
- Country: United States
- Website: recordcourier.com

The Record-Courier is a twice-a-week newspaper in Gardnerville, Nevada. It is one of the oldest continuously published nameplates in Nevada. The Record-Courier covers Carson Valley, located in Douglas County, Alpine County (California), and Mono County (California) in the eastern Sierra Nevada.

== History ==
The newspaper has its origins in The Carson Valley News founded in Genoa, Nevada by A. C. Pratt on Feb. 20, 1875. The newspaper was sold to Boynton Carlisle in 1880 and he renamed it to The Genoa Weekly Courier. Soon after the sale John Cradlebaugh opened the Genoa Journal, which was bought by George Smith. Carlisle ran the Courier for six months before selling out to Smith who absorbed it into the Journal.

Smith and Del Williams moved the Journal from Genoa to Gardnerville in 1899, starting a newspaper war with George “The Fiddler” Lamy, who published the Gardnerville Record since July 12, 1898. Lamy sold the Record to traveling dentist Dr. Stoddard P. Southworth and Charles Southworth in 1902. Two years later the Southworths bought the Courier on April 1, 1904 and merged the two to form The Record-Courier. The brothers sold the paper in November that same year to William C. Ezell. Ezell worked as editor and he was joined by business manager Bert N. Selkirk.

In July 1906, Ezell grew ill and put the paper up for sale. That August, it was acquired by George W. Springmeyer. In 1908, Selkirk purchased the paper from the owner's father H.H. Springmeyer. In 1944, Selkirk sold the paper to Arthur N. Suverkrup and his son John. In 1954, Suverkrup sold the paper to J.A. McDermott. In 1965, he sold it to Tony Payton and Tom Dickerson. In 1970, Frank Griffin acquired the paper from Payton and Dickerson. In 1971, Donald and Lynn Woodward, owner of the Sparks Tribune, purchased a partial interest in the business and eventually acquired full ownership.

In 1988, the Woodwards sold the paper to Swift Communications. On August 1, 2019, The Record-Courier along with the Nevada Appeal, the Lahontan Valley News, and the Northern Nevada Business View, were sold to Pacific Publishing Company. The papers reformed under the division Nevada News Group. PPC sold the division in January 2025 to Eagle Valley Publishing, founded by the Appeal's editor Adam Trumble.
