= Sparks Tribune =

Weekly newspaper published in Sparks, Nevada

- Type: Weekly newspaper
- Owner: Battle Born Media
- Publisher: Sherman Frederick
- Managing editor: Eric Dahlberg
- Founded: 1892 (as the Wadsworth Dispatch)
- Language: English
- Headquarters: 155 Glendale Ave #10, Sparks, NV 89431
- Website: sparkstrib.com

The Sparks Tribune is a newspaper published in Sparks, Nevada.

== History ==
On Sept. 21, 1892, the first issue of the weekly Wadsworth Dispatch was published in Wadsworth, Nevada. In 1905, the newspaper was relocated to Sparks, Nevada, and was renamed to the Sparks Dispatch. Joseph J. Jackson was manager. In January 1906, a stock company under the management of Louis Purcell acquired the Dispatch from Jackson and N.A. Hummel, renamed it to the Nevada Forum and expanded it into a tri-weekly.

In October 1906, Purcell moved the paper to a larger headquarters and added a Linotype machine to its printing plant. In 1907, the paper expanded from a tri-weekly to a daily. In 1909, Purcell sold the Sparks Forum to A. Grant Miller. In April 1910, Miller suspended the paper after two lawsuits were filled against the business seeking money owed and the sheriff's department seized the printing plant.

Banker Patrick Howard Mulcahy was appointed receiver of the Forum. Miller lost both suits. In August 1910, Mulcahy took charge of the paper and renamed it to the Sparks Tribune. P.H. Mulcahy died in 1922. His son Edwin C. Mulcahy inherited the paper and operated it until his death in 1949. His widow sold her half interest to Carl B. Shelly in 1950.

In 1955, Shelly beat a lawsuit filled by a former employee seeking company stock, which was denied after terms of an agreement were not met. In 1956, Shelly sold the controlling interest in the business to his son Bruce Shelly. In 1958, George Lill bought the paper from the Shelly family. At some point the paper reverted to a weekly. In 1959, the Tribune resumed daily publication. At the time it had a circulation of 1,500

In July 1961, Gill was jailed for writing a check to an employee with insufficient funds to cover it. He was released on bail. The charges were latter dismissed and the suit was dismissed after restitution was made. However, Lill was charged with contempt of court for another case. The Internal Revenue Service seized and closed the Tribune for nonpayment of employee withholding taxes. Gill came up with the money and the paper reopened after a day. Gill failed to appear for a court date in his IRS case due to a misunderstanding and the contempt charges were dropped.

In August 1961, that same former employee filled another lawsuit against the paper seeking back pay. Lill sold the newspaper to Elizabeth Ehrlich. In November 1961, the business filed for Chapter 11 bankruptcy protection. Bankruptcy R.B. Fuhrman took charge of the Tribune and put it up for sale. In March 1962, Ira Jacobson acquired the paper for $2,600. He owned Nevada Printing Co., which published the Tonopah Times-Bonanza & Goldfield News, Reese River Reveille, Eureka Sentinel and Overton Echo. Jacobson appointed Bill Henley as editor and Allen Knox as general manager.

In December 1962, Jacobson sold the Tribune to Jack Carpenter, an administrative assistant to Sen. Alan Bible. In January 1965, W. Stanley Barker, former publisher of the Placerville Mountain Democrat, bought the paper from Carpenter. In 1967, Donald L. Woodward Jr. was named managing editor. In 1969, Woodward became the majority stock owner. In 1971, Woodward purchased a partial interest in the Gardnerville Record-Courier. In 1977, James B. McClatchy board chairman of McClatchy Newspapers, bought a90% stake in the Sparks Tribune.

In 1981, McClatchy and Woodward sold the paper to Kearns-Tribune Corporation, owner of The Salt Lake Tribune. At that time the paper had a circulation of 14,000. In 1998, Kearns-Tribune sold the Sparks Tribune to A.L. Alford Jr., owner of the Lewiston Morning Tribune and Moscow-Pullman Daily News. In 2003, Alford sold the Tribune to Randy Frisch and Dominic Welch. In 2015, Battle Born Media, which owned five other papers in Nevada, acquired the Tribune.
