= The Mercury (defunct Oregon newspaper) =

Defunct weekly newspaper in Salem, Oregon, U.S.

The Mercury, later The Sunday Mercury, was a weekly newspaper founded in Salem, Oregon, United States in 1869, and moved to Portland a few years later. Oregon writer Homer Davenport described approaching the Mercury when he arrived in Portland as a young man, and being sent to New Orleans to cover and draw pictures of the Fitzsimmons-Dempsey fight.

The Mercury was best known for being the subject of an 1893 libel lawsuit involving attorney and writer C.E.S. Wood. The Oregon Supreme Court ruled against O. P. Mason and B. P. Watson, and the newspaper itself was turned over to receiver A. A. Rosenthal. Rosenthal promised to "make a decent paper of it," but the paper was raided by the Portland district attorney's office later that year and suppressed for publishing offensive material. A November 19, 1893 Oregonian editorial praised the actions against a publication "insidiously demoralizing as well as unspeakably offensive."

The paper continued into the 20th century, with C. H. Clute and William J. Swope in charge. It was described as a legitimate enterprise, but elsewhere it was described as a "sensational" paper given to "gossips and scandal." In 1899 a Mr. Cummins, described as "head of a respectable family," accused Swope, who was then publisher, editor, and proprietor of the paper of libel and slander, and a warrant was issued for Swope's arrest. Newspapers around the state continued to mention the Mercury until at least the early 1930s, often continuing to reference its legal entanglements and its propensity for sensationalism.

== See also ==
- List of Oregon newspapers
