= The Colorado Independent =

Regional news website (2006–2020)

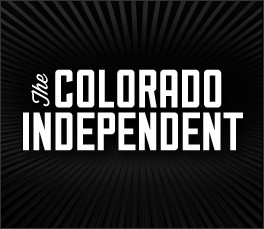
- Website type: News
- Available in: English
- Creator: David Bennahum
- Website: www.coloradoindependent.com
- Launched: 2006
- Current status: Defunct

The Colorado Independent was a nonprofit media organization, first reporting news via its online website that was started in July 2006, later revitalized again in September 2013 under new Colorado-based management.

The Colorado Independent, an online nonprofit news organization, is defunct. It was launched in 2006 as part of a network of local news websites, initially called Colorado Confidential, that focused on regional government and politics and were run by the Washington, D.C.-based Center for Independent Media, later known as the American Independent News Network (AINN). AINN started closing its websites in 2013 due to funding problems.

The Colorado Independent was relaunched in September 2013 by editor Susan Greene and managing editor John Tomasic, who secured funding from two local Colorado foundations: The Gill Foundation and the Bohemian Foundation. The revived Colorado Independent broadened its reporting focus, updated its website design, and assembled a team of veteran journalists. It also received grants from the Zell Family Foundation, the Douglas H. Phelps Foundation, and individual online contributions.

The organization positioned itself as a "small-media, big news movement" and actively engaged with the community through monthly events and forums. They embraced a philosophy of sharing their content freely, encouraging other news outlets and readers to "Steal our copy, please. Post it far and wide. Give us credit". However, the organization's independence faced scrutiny due to its donor base, which included long-time Democratic supporters, leading to difficulties in obtaining credentials for its staffers to access the floor of the state Legislature.

In April 2025, the Colorado Springs Independent, a weekly alternative newspaper commonly known as The Indy, which had been acquired by new owners J.W. Roth and Kevin O'Neil in February 2024 and relaunched, also laid off all staff and was sold again, this time to Dirk R. Hobbs and Colorado Media Group. Hobbs intends to relaunch The Independent and incorporate the Colorado Springs Business Journal into Southern Colorado Business Forum & Digest.

The Southern Colorado Press Club, another journalism support organization, also disbanded at the end of its 2024-2025 term, citing a decline in participation.

== Coverage ==
The Colorado Independent covered state politics and policy issues such as the economy, education, the environment, energy development, criminal justice, social justice, gay rights and reproductive rights with a focus on criminal-justice issues. Its mission statement is: “The only bias we have is for good journalism." "The goal is to make impact, to inspire action by moving readers on important issues with stories that provide missing context, unearth buried facts, and amplify unheard voices".

== Contributors ==
The Colorado Independent featured a twice weekly column by Mike Littwin, a figure in Colorado journalism known for his work at the Rocky Mountain News and The Denver Post. Regular contributors included reporters Tessa Cheek and Bob Berwyn and Pulitzer-winning cartoonist Mike Keefe.

Despite the fact that the members of The Colorado Independent writing staff are made up of experienced reporters who are veterans from traditional newspapers, The Colorado Independent was initially denied press credentials that would allow the organization to have a reporter at the Colorado House and/or the Colorado Senate. As of January 2015, credentials were approved.

== Location ==
The operation is headquartered at the Open Media Foundation building in Denver's Santa Fe Art's District. Members of the reporting team work out of the newsroom there, and from their communities in Boulder, Summit County, Eagle County and Colorado Springs.

== Outreach ==
The Colorado Independent held monthly public events and forums focused on journalism and issues affecting Colorado communities. The nonprofit publication was funded through foundation grants and individual donations and encouraged other news organizations to republish its reporting.

As part of the Independent’s educational mission, veteran journalists train young staffers and interns the basics of shoe-leather reporting. The Millennials, in turn, teach the newspaper refugees how to broaden their craft through digital-information media.

In February 2014, the Independent had filed for an FCC low power FM radio construction permit, but it was cancelled (and subsequently expired).
