= Monterey Herald =

Daily newspaper published in Monterey, California, US

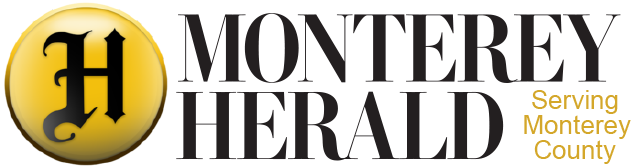

- The July 27, 2009 front page of The Monterey County Herald
- Type: Daily newspaper
- Format: Broadsheet
- Owner: Digital First Media
- Founders: Allen Griffin; Phyllis Hayes-Griffin; Everis A. Hayes
- Publisher: Chico Enterprise Record, 400 E. Park Avenue, Chico, California
- Editor: David Kellogg
- Founded: 1922
- Language: English
- Headquarters: 2555 Garden Road, Monterey, California
- Circulation: 23,862 Daily; 58,001 Sunday (as of March 2013)
- Sister newspapers: Santa Cruz Sentinel
- ISSN: 0889-3101
- Website: montereyherald.com

The Monterey Herald, informally known as the The Monterey County Herald, is a daily newspaper digitally produced and published in print at Chico, California, and written at Monterey, California, serving Monterey County. It is owned by Media News Group, which is owned by Alden Global Capital, a hedge fund in New York City largely managed by the millionaires Randall D. Smith and Heath Freeman, who have a national reputation for downsizing and dismantling newspapers. In the 1900's, hundreds of people worked for the Herald. As of July 2026, there are less than six journalists responsible for a coverage area twice the size of Delaware.

== Earlier papers known as the Monterey Herald ==
While there were two original papers known as the Monterey Herald, they were common to the modern paper only in their name.

=== Monterey Weekly Herald (1874–1876) ===
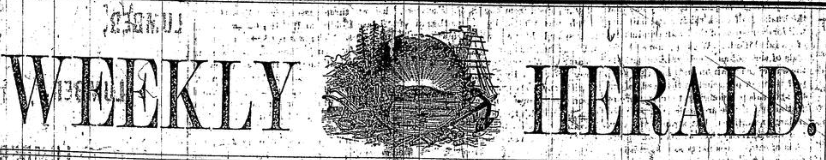
Logo from the Weekly Herald from 1874 to 1876.

The first capitol of California, and the original County Seat, was the city of Monterey. The County Seat, however, left Monterey in 1873, and the newsmen followed, leaving the city without a newspaper. In the Fall of 1874, two entrepreneurs named George Clevenger and Steve Clevenger (in some sources, spelled Cleavenger) started a newspaper called the Herald. In various sources, it is called the Monterey Herald, the Weekly Herald, or the Monterey Weekly Herald. Steve Clevenger was an "energetic young man," and a former typesetter from San Jose. In August 1875, Steve Clevenger sold his interests in the Herald to the printing house Walton & Curtis, with plans to move to San Jose.

Walton & Curtis, the publishing house, was partially the namesake of Edwin Emmet Curtis, who by 1889 was listed as the telegraph editor of the San Francisco Chronicle. The other half was W. H. F. Walton. Their most notable printing was the book The Hand Book to Monterey and Vicinity.

In September 1875, the Monterey Herald stated that: "cash is scarce... we are prepared to receive pianos, wheelbarrows, stove-wood, abalones and small sized whales in payment of subscriptions." By October 1875, W. H. Fitz Walton (also known as W. H. Walton Wright) had sold his own interest in the Monterey Herald to Curtis and Manuel Robert Merritt. M. R. Merritt, born in Monterey in 1855, had formerly worked as a printer at the Monterey Republican and as the owner of the Castroville Argus, the paper formerly established by Juan B. Castro (namesake of Castroville).

The Herald "died" on April 8, 1876. The editor of the paper wrote an obituary for the paper which read: "Aged 1 year and 47 numbers. Who killed the Herald? 'I' said Monterey. 'With my poor pay, I killed the Herald." Gone to meet the Monterey Union, Gazette, and Republican. Requiescat in pace."

=== Monterey Herald (1909-1910) ===
On May 30, 1909, another publication named the Monterey Herald started production. Harry H. Green was the office foreman, formerly of the Salinas Democrat, and B. J. O'Donnell was the city editor. In mid-July, the reporter J. S. Cantwell, nicknamed Can't, left his position in Santa Cruz to work at the Herald. At the end of July, Frank Willard Kimball was brought in as managing editor, in those days known as the editing tripod. Kimball immediately got to work trying to re-establish Monterey as the County Seat, using his paper to accomplish this.

In February 1910, L.R. Grover sold the Monterey Herald to George Schultzberg and J. J. McIntosh, two local area schoolteachers. Newspapers at the time reported that Schultzberg aspired to use the paper to secure the Republican nomination against the Superintendent of the county school district. In March, Schulzberg withdrew his name for the race for Superintendent, and told his fellow journalists that: "I did not buy the newspaper to further my political aspirations... Monterey needs a newspaper."

On April 19, 1910, articles of incorporation were filed for the Weybret-Lee Publishing and Printing company in Monterey. The directors were George Schultzberg, W. T. Lee, F. Weybret, George R. Higby, and Clement H. Wilson, all residents of the Monterey Peninsula. Lee and Weybret were owners of a job notice printer, and merged their printing operation into the Herald.

On April 27, 1910, the new Monterey Herald Publishing Company was incorporated with the Monterey county clerk's office. The new directors were named S. A. Davis, H. H. McLeroth, and William Sandholdt, Jr. In May 1910, Bernie J. O'Donnell retired from Stanford University and resumed his position at the Herald. At the end of June, 1910, William Sandholdt, the editor of the Monterey Herald was in Salinas on "law business."

On July 8, 1910, the Monterey Herald announced that it was ceasing production.

== History ==
=== Peninsula Daily Herald (1922–1929) ===
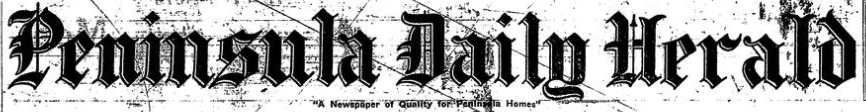
Logo of the Peninsula Daily Herald from 1922 to 1929.

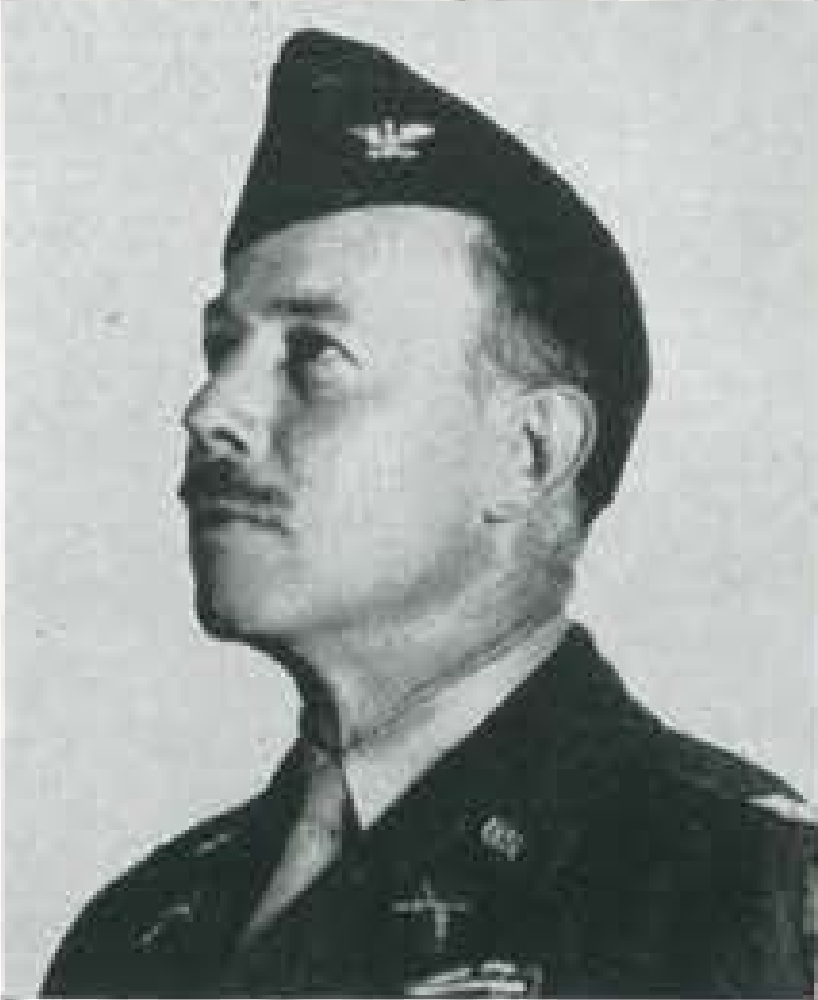
R. Allen Griffin. He was a hero of both world wars. After WW2, most people just called him "Colonel."

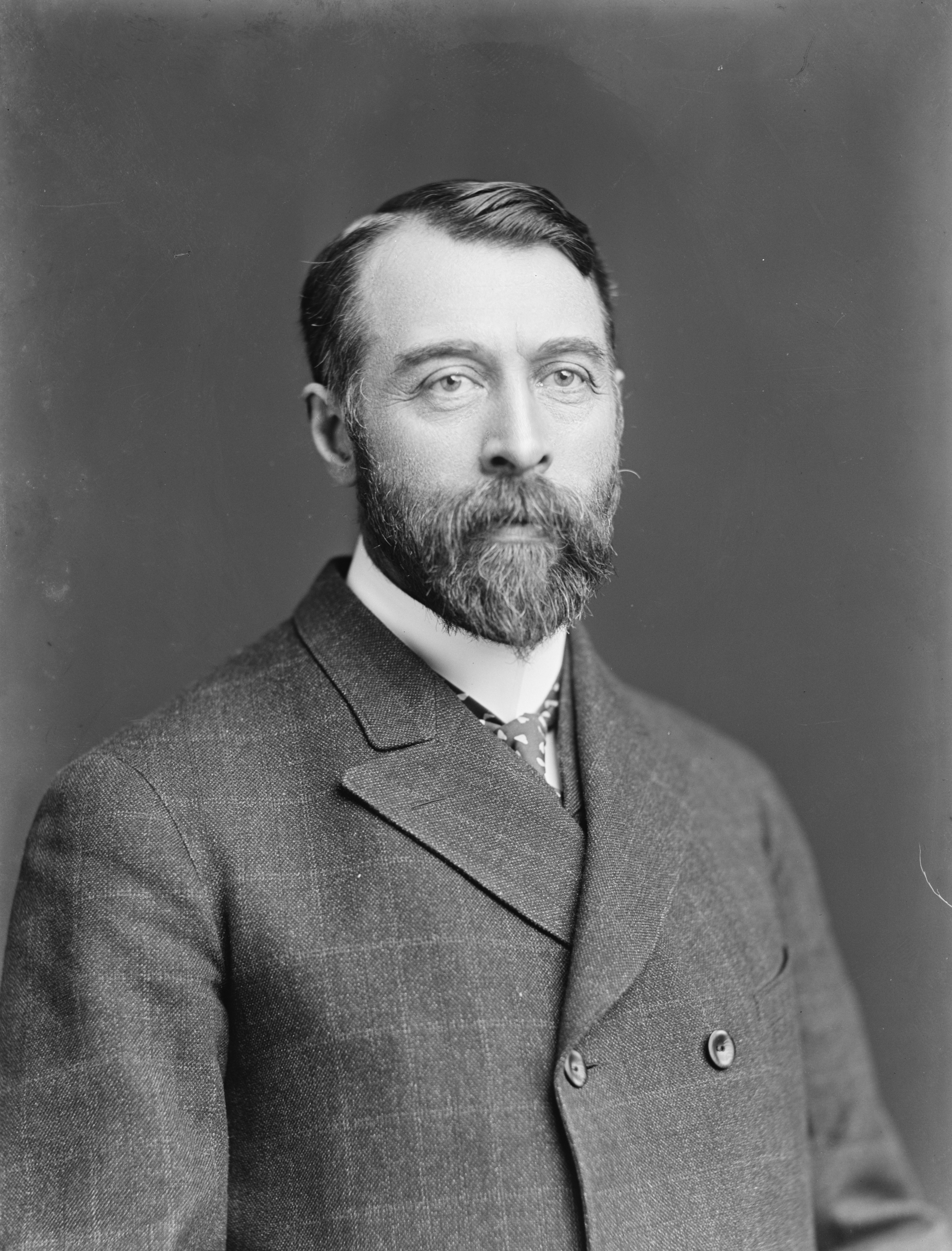
Everis Hayes (Griffin's father-in-law) was listed on the articles of incorporation as a director of the Peninsula Daily Herald Company.

As early as January 1922, rumors circulated in the Monterey Bay area that a newspaper was being planned to open sometime that February. It was to be called the Peninsula Herald, and jointly owned by Harold Hayes and Allen Griffin. That January, the men were already recruiting journalists to staff the newspaper, which was to be 8 pages, and distributed to Monterey, Pacific Grove, Carmel, New Monterey, and Del Monte. Two competing newspapers did exist in the area; the Monterey Cypress and the Pacific Grove Review. One of their first hired journalists was Warren J. Hall.

On June 15, 1922, the first issue of the Peninsula Daily Herald was published. At the top of the front page on the issue of June 21 were the words "Greetings Monterey Peninsula." In the upper right corner, an arrow pointed at the newspaper's logo, next to the words "To a Greater Monterey Peninsula, straight ahead."

On the morning of July 16, 1922, the Peninsula Daily Herald Company, registered in Monterey, filed articles of incorporation with the Monterey County Clerk's office in Salinas. Listed on the filing as directors were E. A. Hayes, Allen Griffin, and Phyllis H. Griffin. Allen Griffin and Phyllis Hayes Griffin had been married since 1917.

Robert Allen Griffin, known as Allen Griffin, had previously been the senior editor of his high school newspaper, editor of several newspapers at Stanford University, and creator of the Stanford Illustrated Review. During World War I, Griffin had been the commander of Company F, 364th Infantry Regiment, 91st Infantry Division – known as the "Wild West Division" – where he had earned the Distinguished Service Cross.

Everis Anson "Red" Hayes was the son of Mary Hayes Chynoweth, who alongside his brother J.O. Hayes, had been the owner of the San Jose Mercury, the San Jose Herald, and later the San Jose Mercury-Herald. Hayes had served seven terms in the United States Congress representing California, leaving that career in 1919. Everis Anson Hayes was Phyllis's father, and Allen's father-in-law.

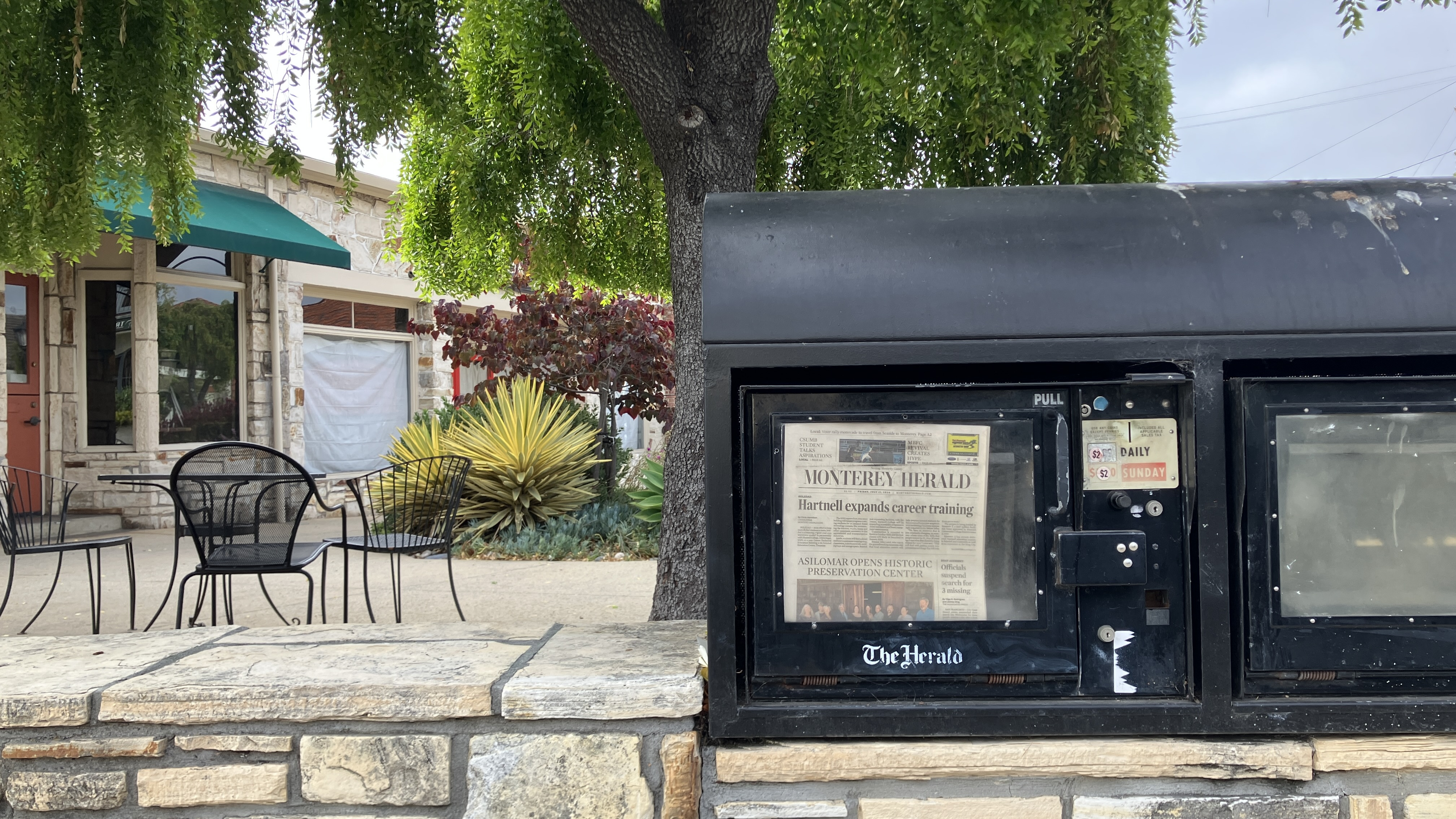
Monterey Herald newspaper stand outside of the newspaper's 1927 printing press, in downtown Monterey.

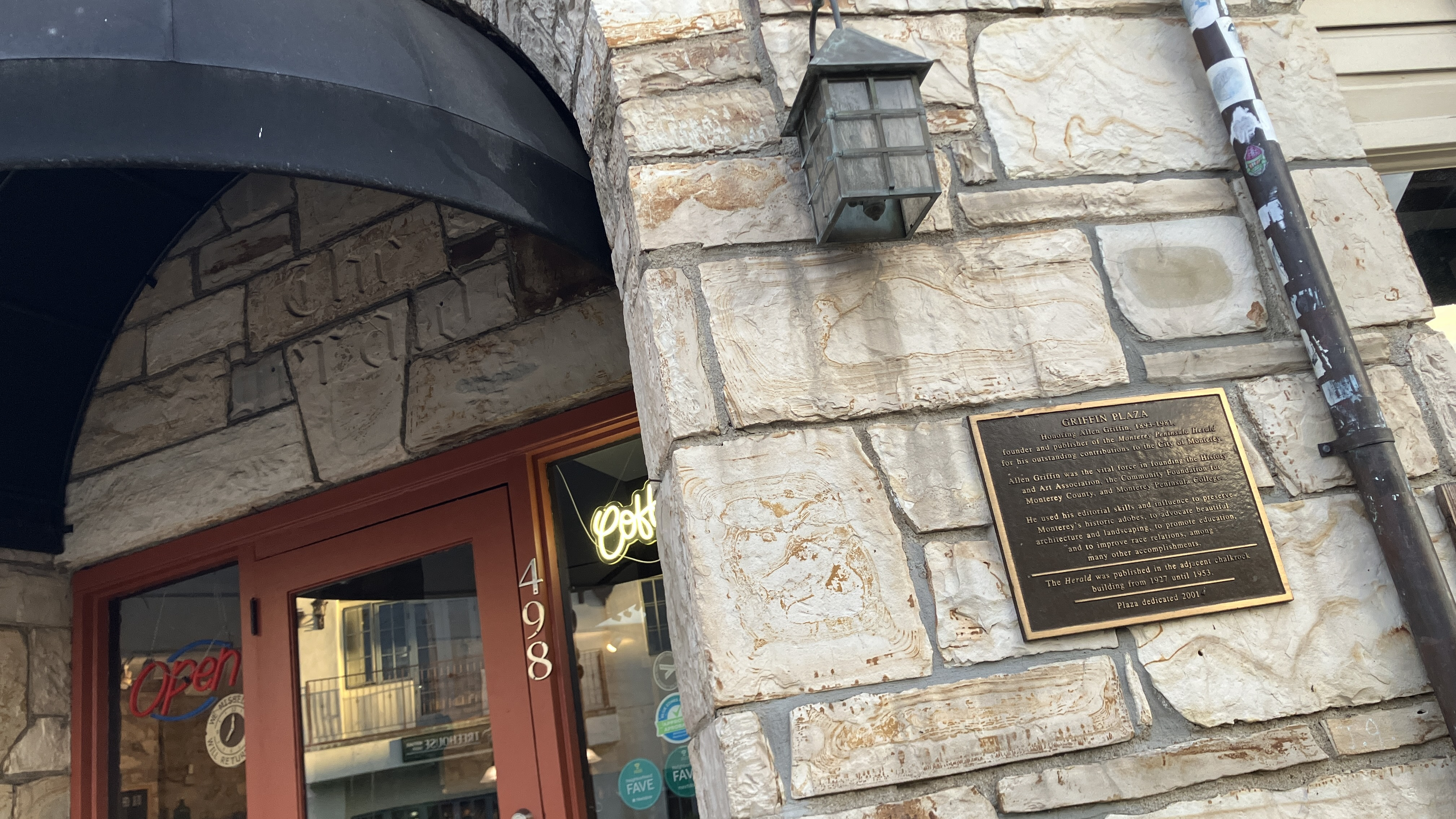
The words The Herald are still etched into the stone above the doorway to Monterey's East Village Cafe, next to Griffin Plaza.

In 1927, the Herald moved into the newly built Carmel stone chalk rock building at the corner of Washington Street and Pearl Street. The building had been designed by A. Nostovich and built by A. C. Anthony. Originally, the building had a mission tile roof. Alternatively, the building is known as the J. C. Anthony Building, but J.C. Anthony designed and built dozens of buildings in the area, so it is most commonly referred to as the Old Herald Building. The words The Herald are still carved into the arched panel above the main door.

=== Monterey Peninsula Herald (1929–1986) ===
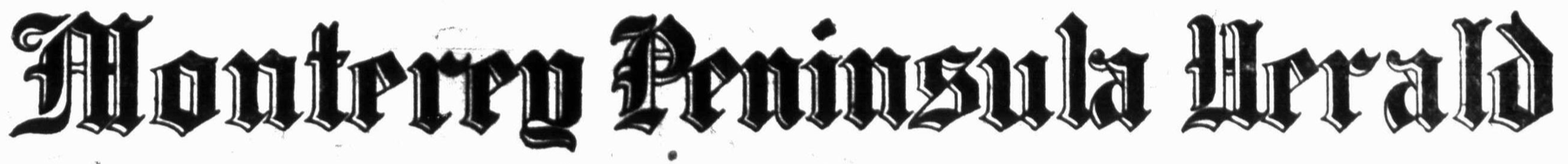
Logo of the Monterey Peninsula Herald from 1929 to 1986.

Griffin bought Monterey Cypress American and consolidated it with his paper, later renamed the Monterey Peninsula Herald. Allen returned to the military during World War II. He served as deputy chief of the ECA China Mission and set up the first United States operation on Formosa after the collapse of Free China.

In 1949, Edward Kennedy was hired as the Herald's editor-in-chief. Kennedy, as an Associated Press correspondent, had won celebrity, and considerable criticism, in the closing days of World War II by announcing Germany's surrender one day before that announcement was supposed to have been made.

In 1951, Robert K. Bullock, who had joined the Herald in 1949, was made sports editor. By the 1970's, newspapers in the region referred to him as the "Dean of Monterey Bay Area Sports Journalism."

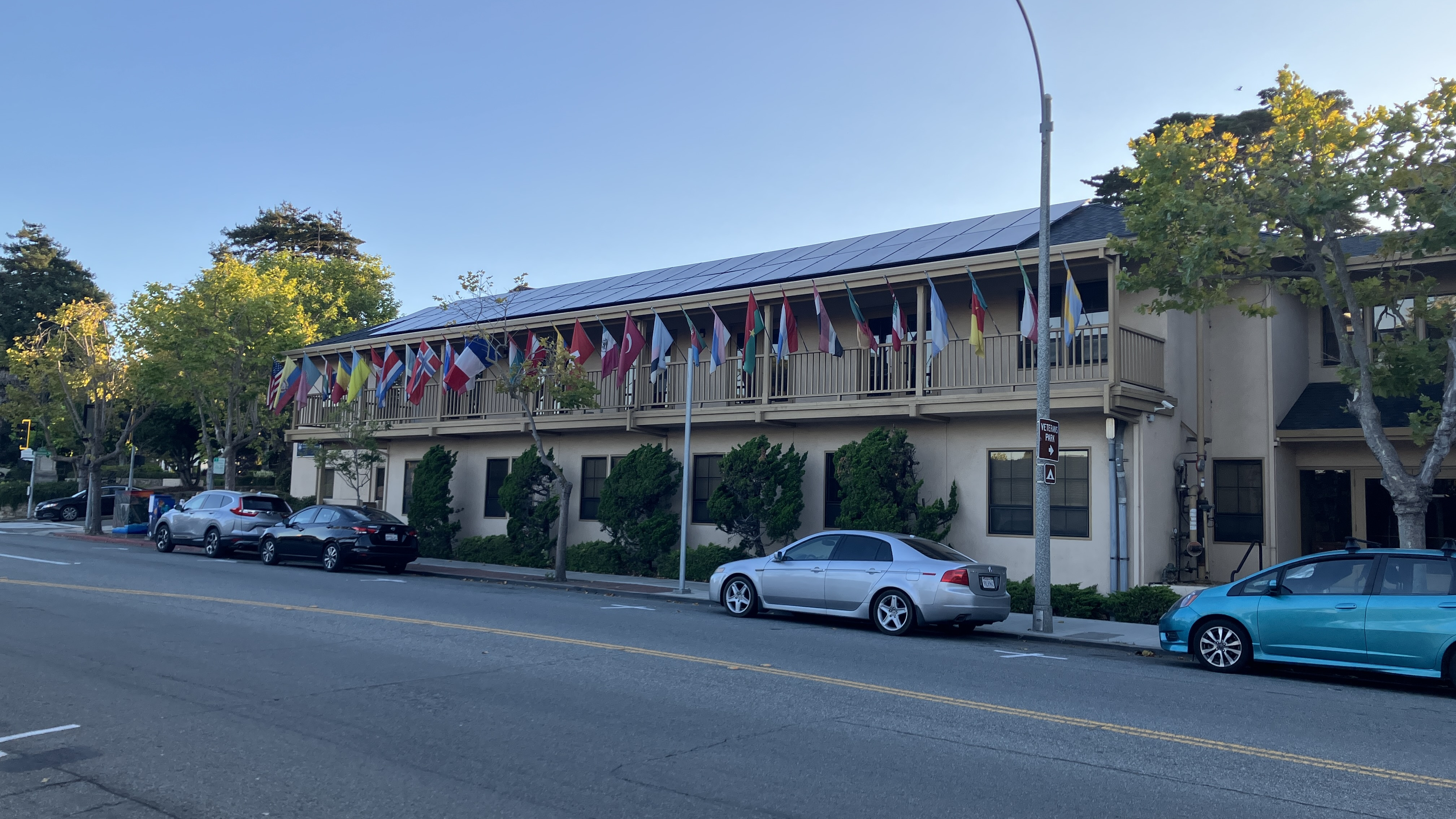
In 1953, the Herald moved to an office on Pacific Street. In the 80's, that building was remodeled by its new owners, the Monterey Institute of International Studies.

In 1953, The Herald moved into its new headquarters building at the corner Pacific Street and Jefferson Street, in the old Monterey neighborhood of Spaghetti Hill. That building is now on the campus of the Middlebury Institute of International Studies at Monterey. It was remodeled in the Bay Area Style, associated with William Wurster.

Phyllis Hayes Griffin died in 1956, still a co-owner of the Herald alongside Allen Griffin, despite their earlier divorce.

In September 1963, Allen Griffin, then 70 years old, named Pete Arthur Jr. (full name Franklin K. Arthur Jr.) as his replacement to the office of publisher and editor. Arthur had formerly been a reporter at the San Bernardino Sun, and was at that time the New York Bureau Chief of the Associated Press. He left his posting at the AP for the Herald, where his former colleague Edward Kennedy, who was now assistant editor, was appointed associate editor. Allen Griffin took up a position as President of the publication.

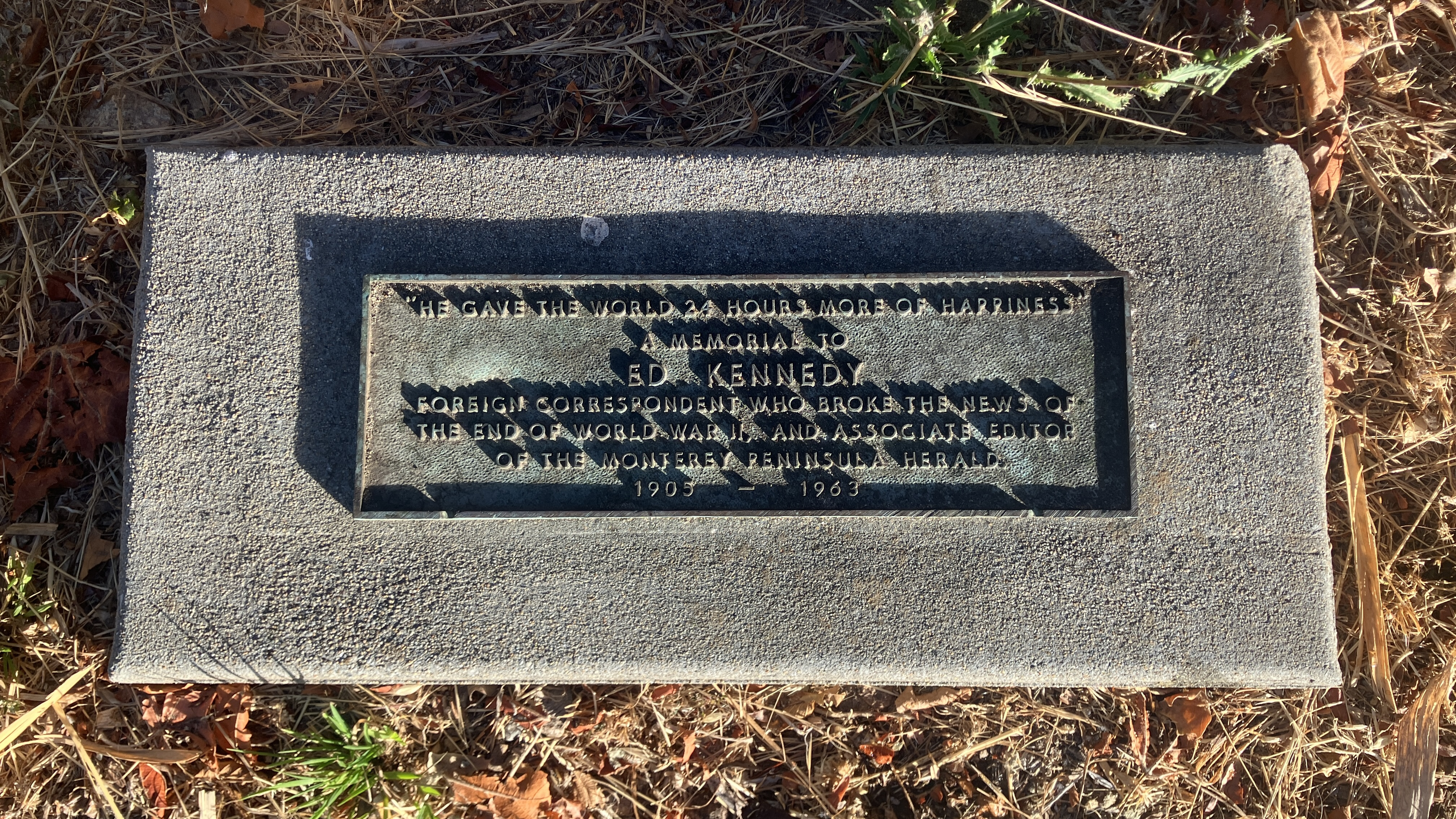
Memorial plaque for Edward Kennedy in Seaside, in Laguna Grande Park.

Six days after the Assassination of John F. Kennedy, on Sunday morning, Edward Kennedy was crossing the street, and was hit by a 24-year-old woman driving a sports car. He suffered multiple fractures, and was rushed to Monterey Community Hospital. While performing his autopsy, doctors discovered a tumorous lump in his throat, and declared that Kennedy had died of cancer, not the accident. A small memorial plaque in Seaside memorializes him for having given the world an extra day of peace.

=== Block and Blade (1967–1992) ===
In 1967, the Herald was acquired by the famous Block family and Blade Communications, owners of the Toledo Blade. At that time the paper had a circulation of 30,000. Griffin remained at the paper, and ensured that management policies would remain the same. Griffin retired three years later, in 1970.

In 1971, an employee at the Toledo Blade, Albert Cross, came to work at the Monterey Peninsula Herald for the first time, working for both papers simultaneously. In 1980, Cross was named managing editor of the Herald. In 1981, he was named executive director of the Blade.

In July 1974, a severe case of cancer forced Pete Arthur to retire as publisher and editor of the Herald. He died 4 months later, in November.

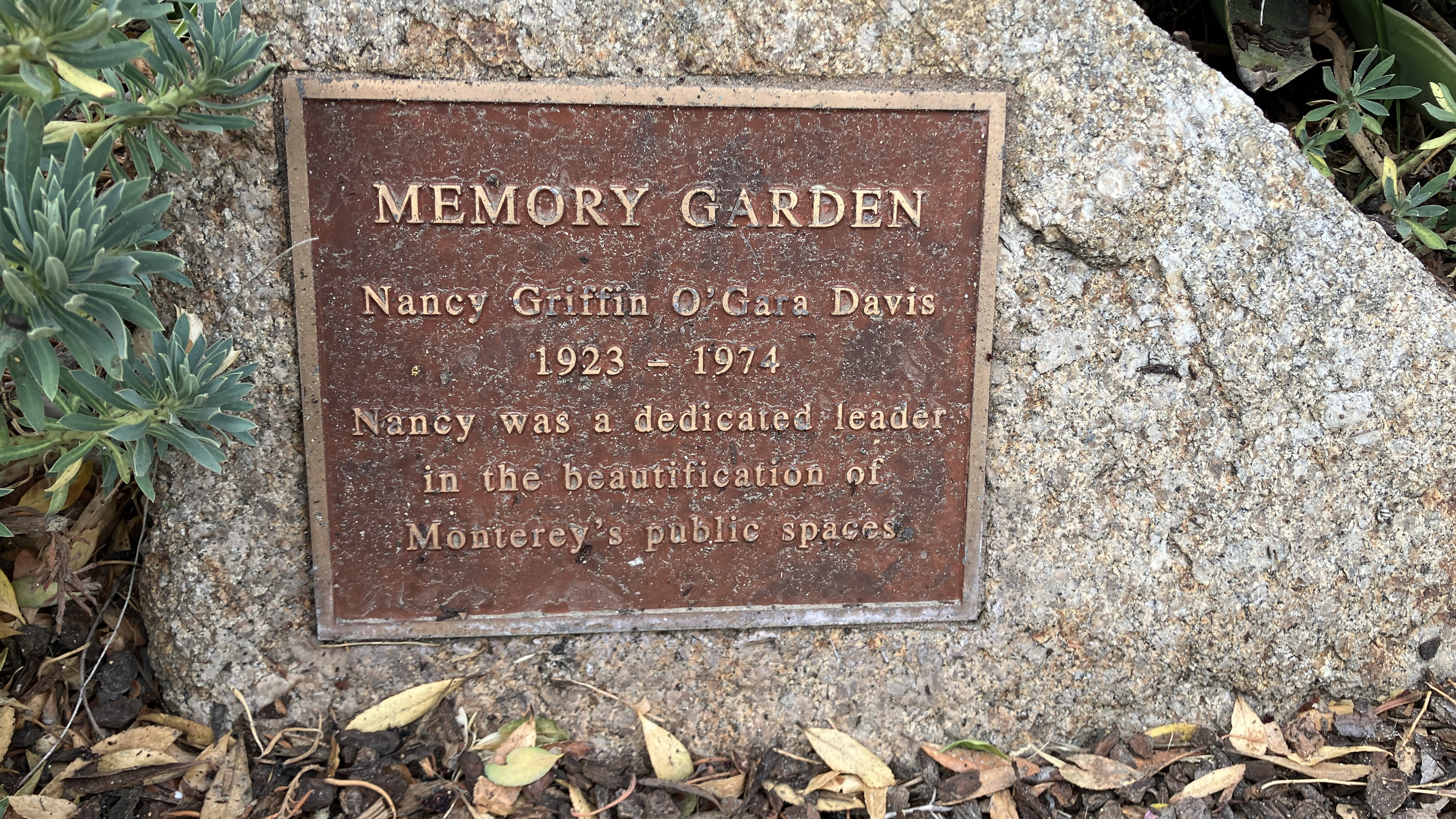
Memorial to Nancy Griffin Davis, daughter of Allen Griffin and Phyllis Hayes Griffin, dedicating the Nancy Griffin Memorial Garden in Griffin Plaza.

Also in November 1974, Nancy Griffin, daughter of Allen Griffin and part-owner of the Herald, died.

In 1976, Fred Hawes, the advertising manager of the Herald for over three decades, who had joined the paper in 1922 as a paperboy, retired. He died the following year.

In 1980, Jimmy Costello, who had been hired as a reporter at the Herald in 1939, and had served as the City Editor for over 20 years, retired from a 42 year career. He died two years later.

In July 1981, Allen Griffin, the founder of the newspaper, died.

In August 1981, the Herald started started morning publication for seven days a week. Prior to this, from 1974, it had only been an afternoon publication from Monday to Friday, with morning editions on Saturday and Sunday.

In 1982, Joe Livernois was hired as Editor.

In 1982, photojournalist Robert Fish captured a photograph which was published in the paper of a rescue worker walking out of the waters of Monastery Beach, holding a dead and drowned little boy. This sparked outrage among community members who said that the publication showed a lack of respect for the boy and his family.

In January 1983, Pat Griffith was made managing editor.

In September 1983, Richard B. Gifford retired from his position as General Manager of the Monterey Peninsula Herald. Albert Cross was appointed to replace him.

In February 1984, members of the Local 98 of the Newspaper Guild, the labor union, went into contract talks with management negotiators. A tentative agreement was reached in April 1984.

==== The Herald ====
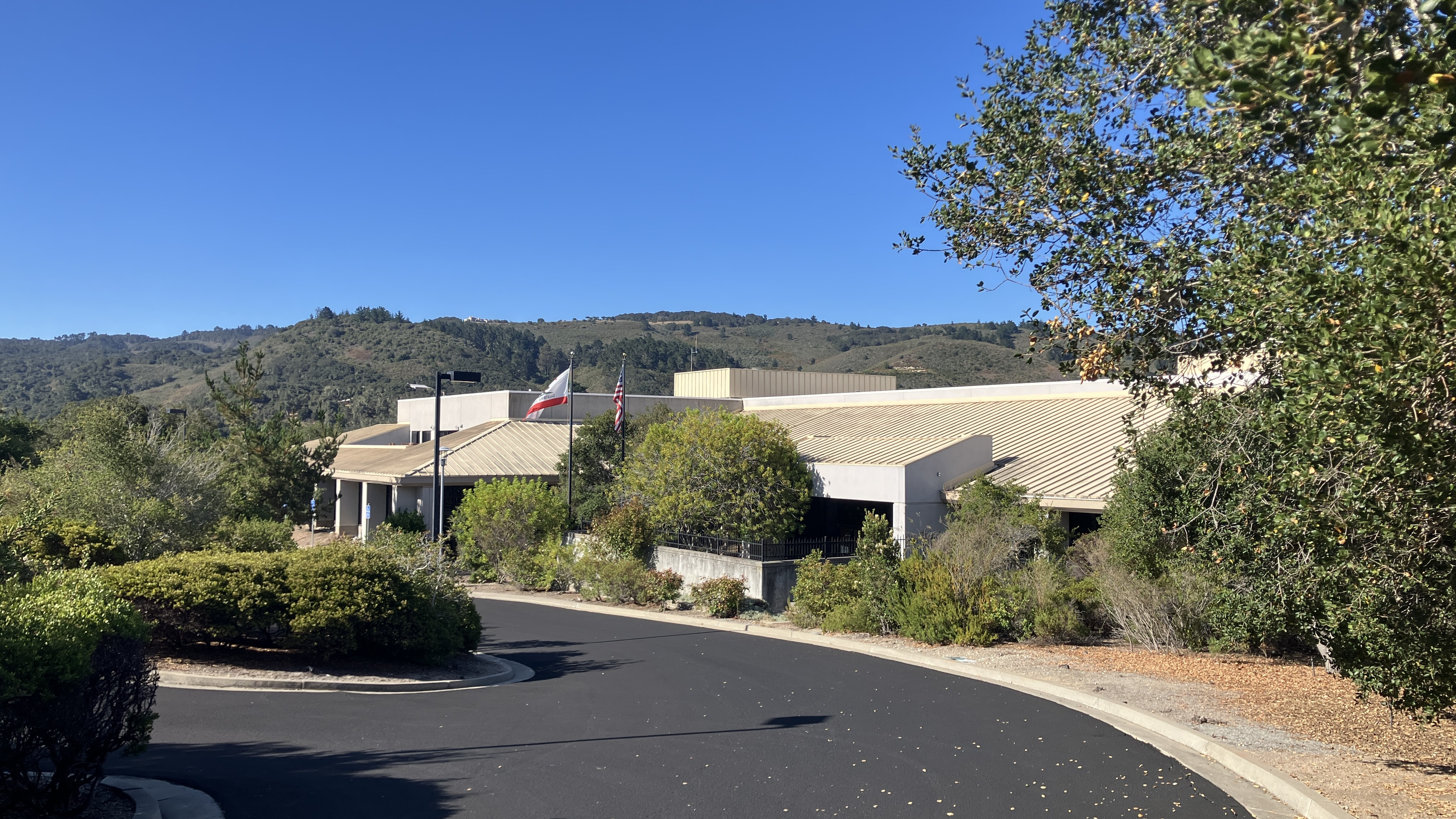
The Herald moved into their new building at 8 Ragsdale Drive in Ryan Ranch in 1988. It was purchased in 2014 by the University Corporation for CSUMBC. In 2026, KAZU also had studios here.

In 1986, the Peninsula Daily Herald began printing under the masthead The Herald for the first time.

In December 1986, Griffin was posthumously inducted into the California Newspaper Hall of Fame.

On March 15, 1987, Paul Block, Jr., the co-publisher of the Toledo Blade, son of Paul Block, died of alzheimer's disease in Monterey. After the Blade company had purchased the Herald, Block had moved to Monterey to manage the paper full time.

In 1988, the Herald relocated their offices from downtown Monterey to a new office complex building at 8 Upper Ragsdale Drive in Ryan Ranch.

=== The Monterey County Herald (1992–2014) ===
==== Scripps (1992–1997) ====
In 1992, the paper was acquired by the E.W. Scripps Company in exchange for the Pittsburgh Press, which Blade merged into its own Pittsburgh Post-Gazette.

==== Knight Ridder (1997–2006) ====
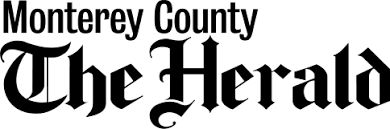
In 1997, The Herald went through a rebranding, and adopted this logo. They used a version of this on their paper masthead and website until 2014.

On July 25, 1997, Scripps sold the The Monterey County Herald, along with The San Luis Obispo Tribune, to Knight Ridder in exchange for the Boulder Daily Camera. Knight Ridder, based in San Jose, already owned six newspapers in the Bay Area. At the time, newspaper executives called this concept "clustering," or the bulk collecting of newspapers within a geographic distribution. This created modern "newspaper chains," which were different in character than those that had defined earlier newspaper generations.

In late July, 1997, Anthony Rider, chairman and CEO of Knight Ridder, visited the Herald and informed them that they were cancelling all union contracts, according to federal law. Knight Ridder fired all Herald employees and required those who wanted their jobs back to reapply. The paper's union members protested in response.

The New York Times wrote at the time:

"Through the years there has been little turnover among the reporters and editors, pressmen and circulation workers at The Herald, because people tend to stay put in Monterey, satisfied that they already live in paradise, tucked between the crescent of ocean bay and the tawny hills of the Coast Range mountains. So news of the mass dismissals was particularly jarring to the staff -- and dismaying to many townspeople who consider the paper a central institution of the community."

The Mayor of Monterey at the time called Knight Ridder's tactics a "meat cleaver approach." At the time, the Herald was the Monterey Peninsula's sixth-largest commercial employer. Of those who reapplied, Knight-Ridder re-hired 90% of them at base-pay. 24 employees did not reapply. They appointed Patricia T. Keil as publisher.

The acquisition was formally completed on August 24.

In 2000, Royal Caulkins joined the Herald as City Editor.

In 2003, Caroline Garcia joined Knight Ridder as Executive Editor for the Herald. While she stated that her goal was to bring in more local reporting, there were an abundance of national articles in the paper during her tenure.

==== McClatchy, Hearst, and MediaNews corporate trades (2006) ====
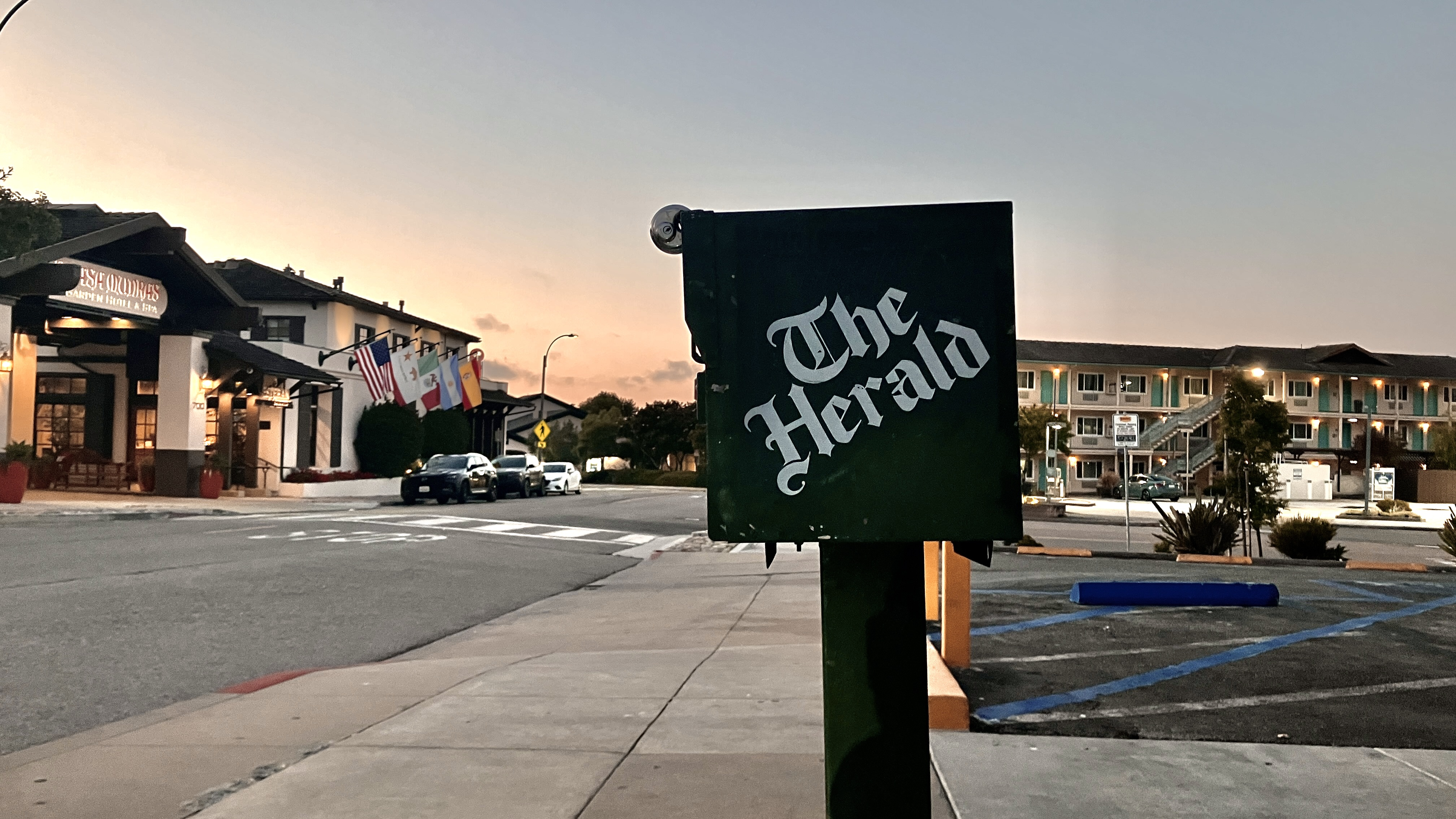
A Monterey Herald newspaper dispenser on Munras Avenue, outside of the Denny's.

In October 2005, Knight Ridder began negotiations with the McClatchy Company about a possible corporate acquisition. The deal was valued at $4.5 billion, giving McClatchy control of 32 newspapers around the country. By that time, more than 1 in 5 daily newspapers in the United States were owned by a company based outside of their coverage area. Only 19% of newspapers were owned by individuals or companies that didn't own any other newspapers.

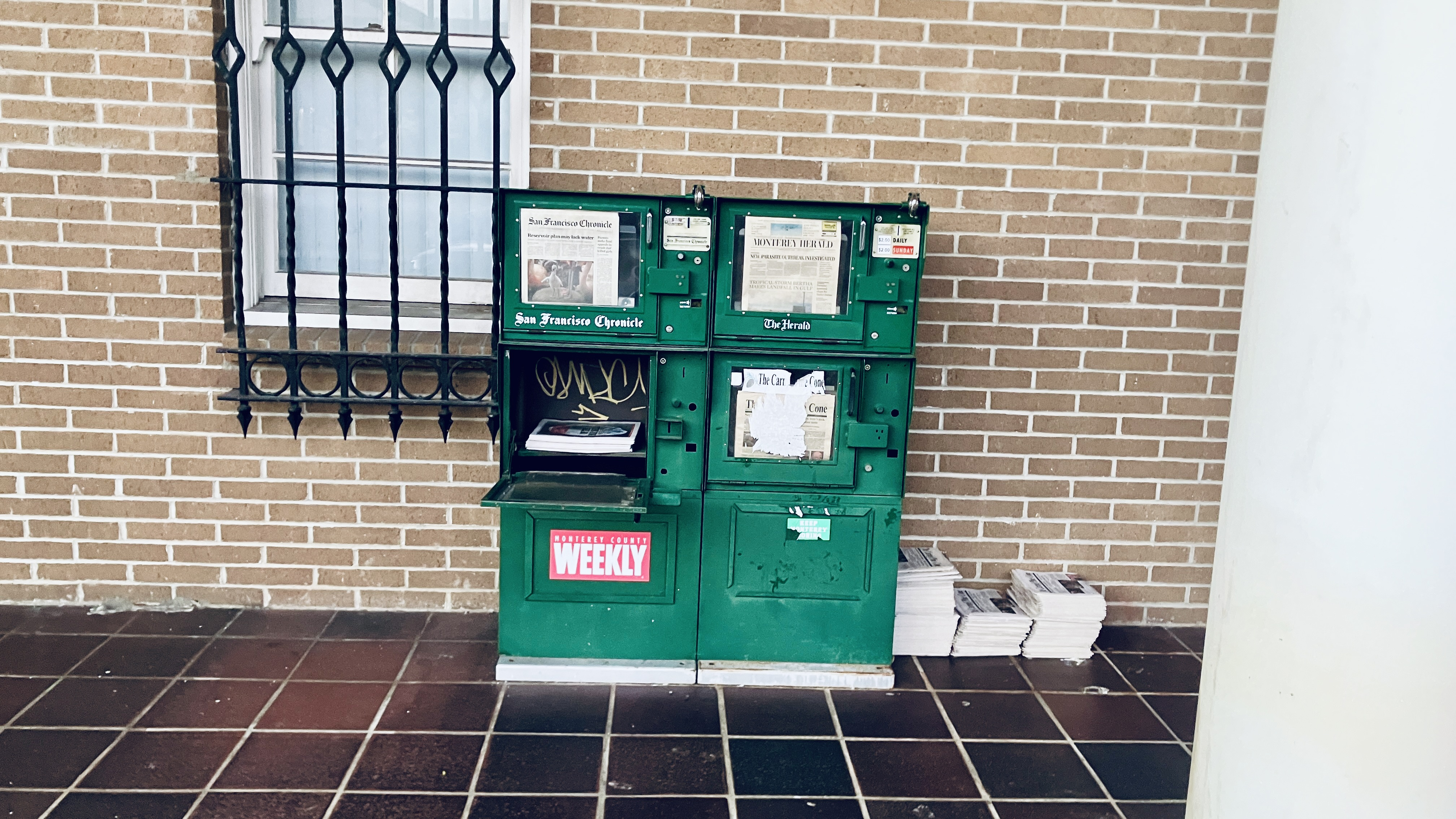
Newspaper dispensers at the Monterey Post Office, in downtown Monterey.

On March 13, 2006, before that deal went forward, McClatchy announced that it planned on selling the Herald alongside 11 other newspapers. McClatchy CEO and chairman Gary B. Pruitt stated that they were: "open to any and all offers." This led to a wave of interested buyers in the 12 newspapers, including several California-based business owners who wished to return local ownership to the news. McClatchy set the deadline for bids on March 28. Nader Agha, a Syrian immigrant and major property developer in Soledad, put in a bid for the Herald. Charles Chrietzberg, the president and CEO of Monterey County Bank also placed a bid. Lewis A. Leader, former editor of the Herald and the Los Angeles Times, joined Agha's bid with his own money. Agha estimated that the Herald at the time was worth between $30 million and $45 million. The Los Angeles Times estimated that the Herald's annual revenue in 2006 was around $26 million.

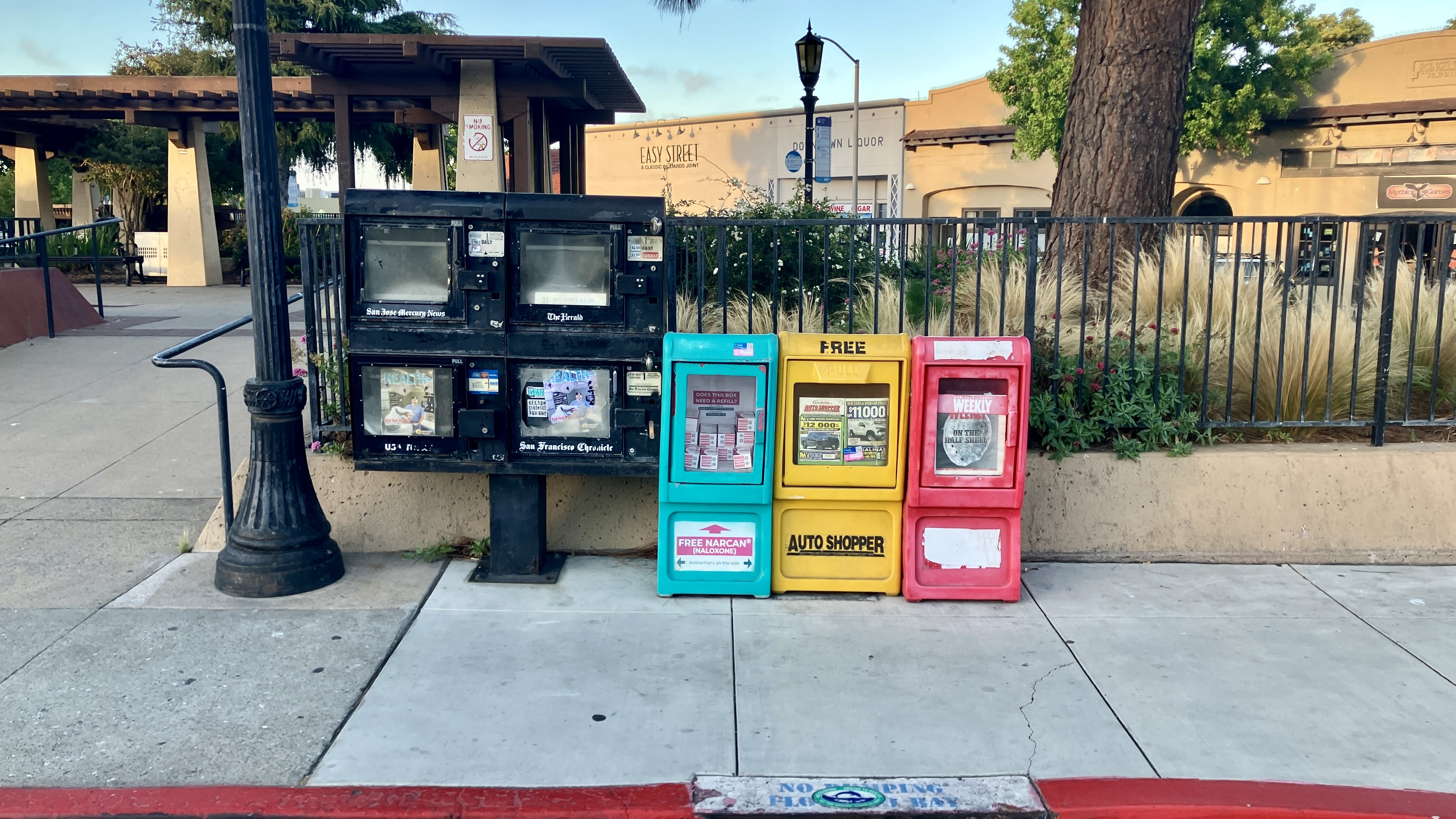
Newspaper dispensers at Simoneau Plaza in downtown Monterey, also known as Monterey Transit Plaza.

On April 26, 2006, the Hearst Corporation and MediaNews Group, headed by William Dean Singleton, signed an agreement with McClatchy to purchase four of the "orphan 12" newspapers, for a collective total of $1 billion in cash. MediaNews purchased the San Jose Mercury News and Contra Costa Times, while Hearst purchased the Monterey Herald, and the St. Paul Pioneer Press. Hearst separately arranged to sell the St. Paul Pioneer Press and Monterey Herald to MediaNews to MediaNews in exchange for an equity investment in their Bay Area assets. The Justice Department, however, launched an investigation into the purchase to ensure that there were no antitrust violations in the deal, because MediaNews already had a large presence in the area. That investigation lasted several months.

On June 22, 2006, the last-ever shareholders meeting of Knight Ridder was held, and Tony Ridder, chairman and CEO, addressed the room in tears. The shareholders approved the sale to McClatchy. McClatchy CEO and chairman Gary B. Pruitt said that he felt "pressure to deliver on the deal," and said that despite increasing online readership, the remaining 20 papers were still profitable enough to make the "transition to online." The Justice Department investigation into the MediaNews Group purchase was still ongoing.

=== MediaNews (2006–Present) ===
Hearst owned the Herald until October 19, 2006, when Hearst and MediaNews finalized their agreement. Hearst acquired a 37% stake in MediaNews, while MediaNews was able to secure The Monterey County Herald, St. Paul Pioneer Press, and an additional newspaper, the Torrance Daily Breeze. After this sale, MediaNews became the single-largest publisher in the Bay Area.

==== Downsizing (2007–Present) ====
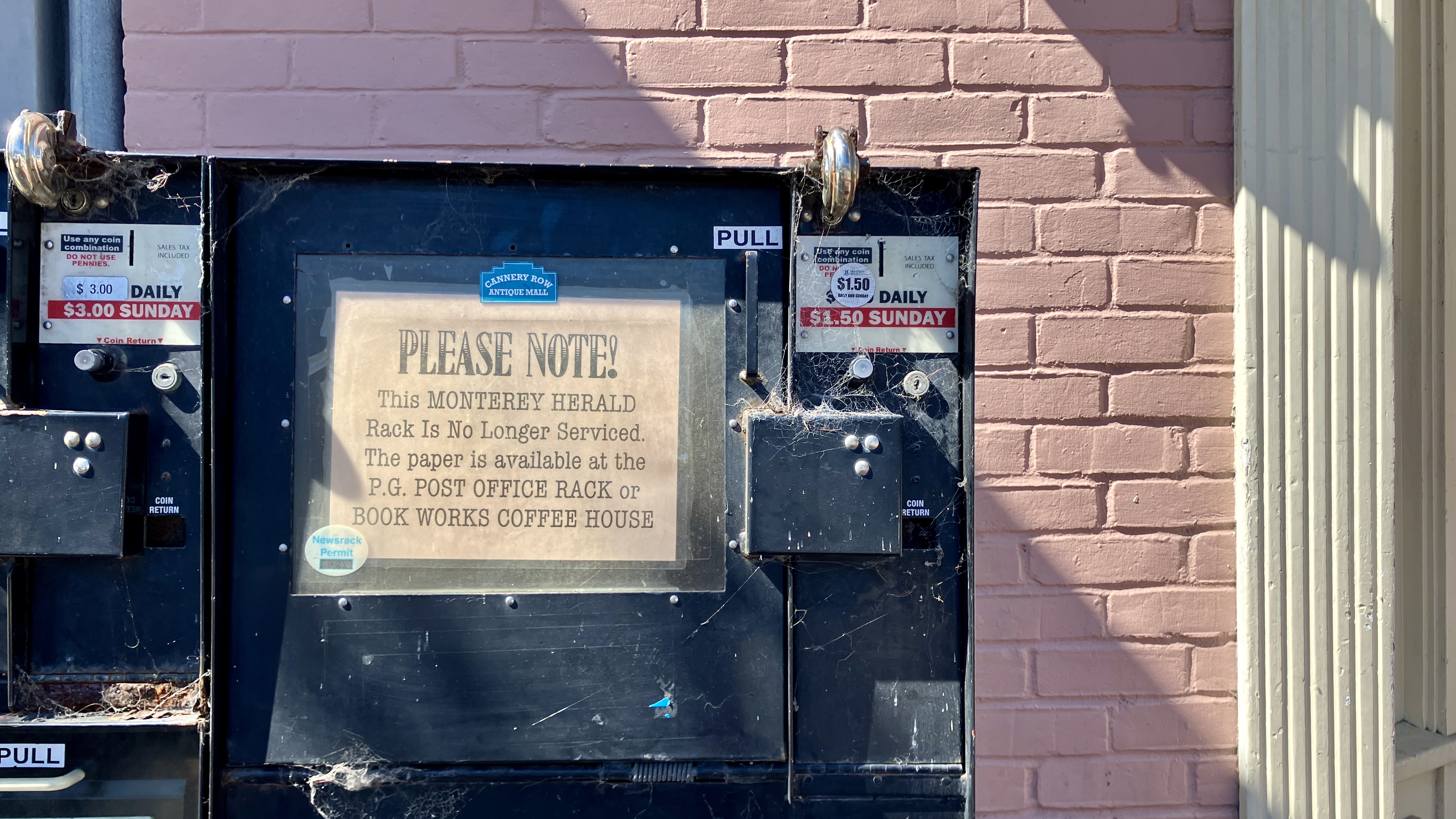
Newspaper dispenser outside of Lopez Liquor in downtown Pacific Grove. A notice is seen indicating that the Monterey Herald no longer distributes to this box.

In the fiscal year ending June 30, 2007, MediaNews announced record revenues of $1.3 billion. This number was up 59% from the previous year. Also on June 30, however, they announced that their total debt was $1.2 billion. By January 2008, the Herald had already gone through two rounds of layoffs under MediaNews. In December 2007, MediaNews canceled publication of the Herald's Sunday Opinion section. They combined the sports and business sections in January, and merged the Monday Business News and Daily Features. Eliminating and merging sections reduced the total print pagecount and eliminated the need for the editorial positions responsible for them.

In April 2007, MediaNews fired eight Herald employees. On January 11, 2008, MediaNews fired another four newsroom employees, and accepted the resignations of five other reporters and editors. On January 18, 2008, MediaNews fired another eight Herald employees, including two editors and one reporter. One newsroom employee said that: "You can see the noose swinging."

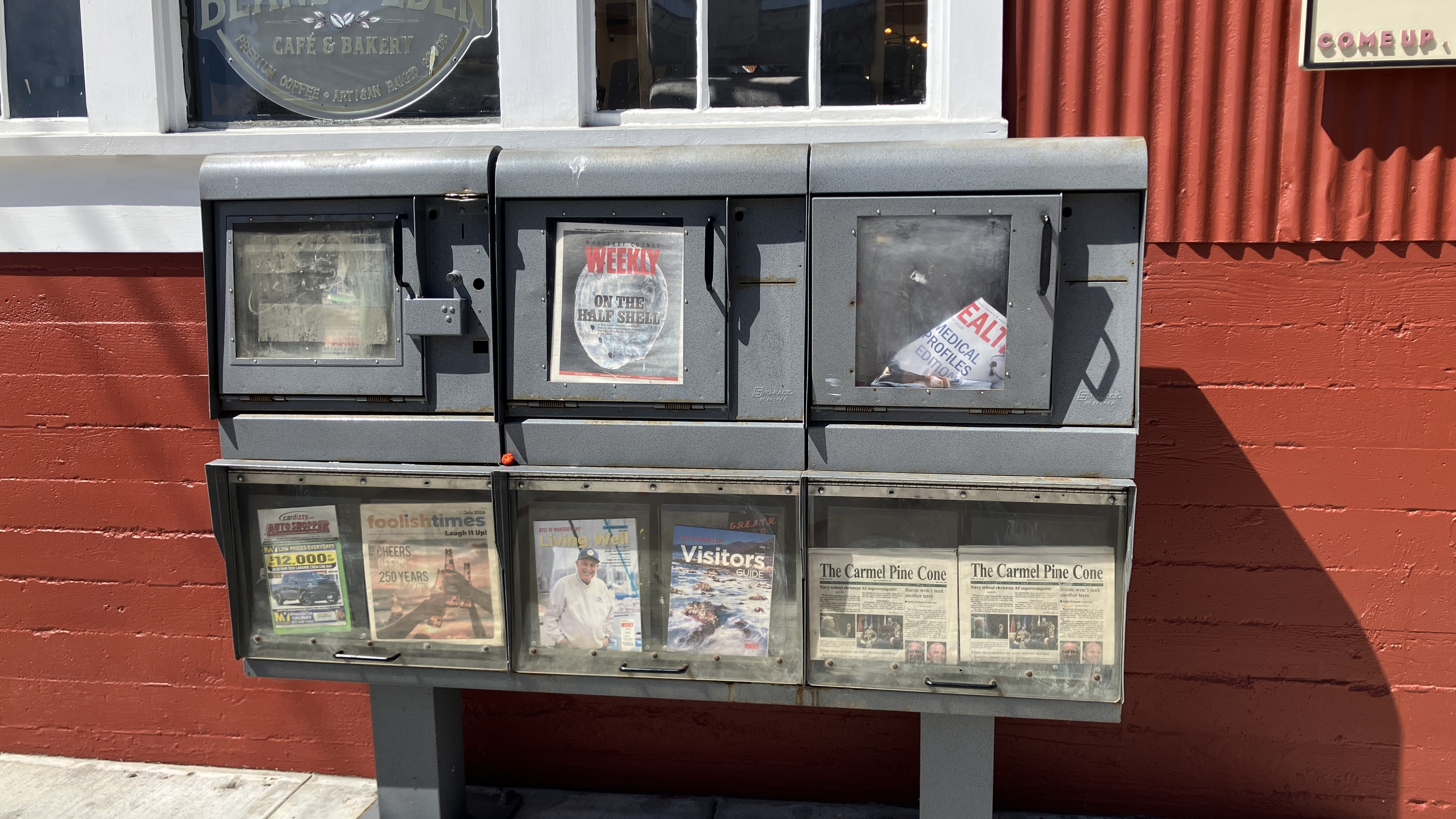
Newspaper vending machines at Cannery Row in New Monterey. The slot once occupied by the Herald has been converted to distribute free newspapers.

In 2012, Joe Livernois left the paper, and was replaced by Caulkins as Editor.

In May 2013, the Herald listed their offices at Ryan Ranch for sale at $7.25 million. In November, members of the University Corporation at Monterey Bay, the major funding function and provider for the California State University at Monterey Bay (CSUMB), toured the building as an interested party.

In July 2013, sports editor Bob Bullock – who had never called in sick for over 10,200 days on the job – died.

In December 2013, MediaNews Group and 21st Century Media merged to create a new company operating under the name of its parent company, Digital First Media.

In the year to come, the paper underwent a "reorganization plan" which included a redesign of both the newspaper and website, the move of newspaper production out-of-area, as well as a change in editor.

=== Monterey Herald (2014–Present) ===
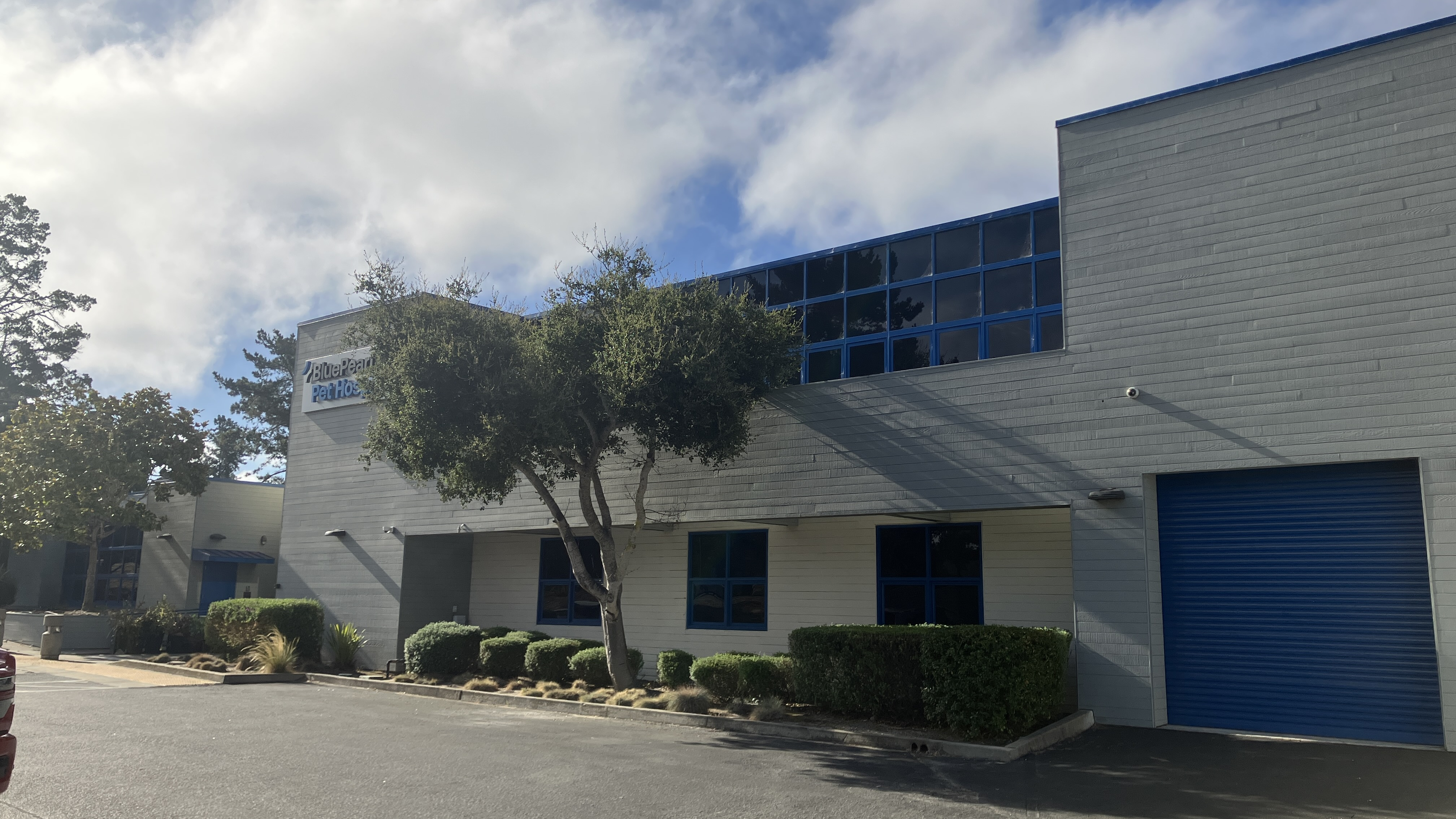
In 2014, the Herald moved into this building at 2200 Garden Road. Around 2021, they vacated the building, which by 2026 was occupied by a Pet Hospital Emergency Room.

On January 25, 2014, Caulkins informed readers that the Herald would have a "new look." He announced that all new production of layout and headlines would be performed in Chico, California, at the offices of the Chico Enterprise-Record. Paginators and copyeditors were some of the first positions to be relocated to Chico. On February 4, 2014, 82% of the members of the Pacific Media Workers Guild at the Herald signed a petition to demand higher wages and healthcare.

On February 7, 2014, Caulkins left the paper. His position was terminated, and filled-in by the editor of the Santa Cruz Sentinel at the time, Don Miller. The employees were informed via mass-email sent-out by publisher Gary Omernick, but the email did not clarify whether Caulkins had been fired, or resigned. Caulkins did leave an outgoing message to his employees, but Omernick removed it from the announcement email. The Pacific Media Guild was in the middle of contract negotiations when the announcement was made. Omernick also worked as the publisher of the Santa Cruz Sentinel at the time, and the Sentinel's ad director, Dan Krolczyk, was hired on February 3, also overseeing ads for the Herald.

In March 2014, the Herald sold their Ryan Ranch building to the University Corporation for $5.7 million. At the time, CSUMB had no plans to relocate students there. As of 2026, that building was part of an extended campus of CSUMB, occupied by the University Corporation and KAZU.

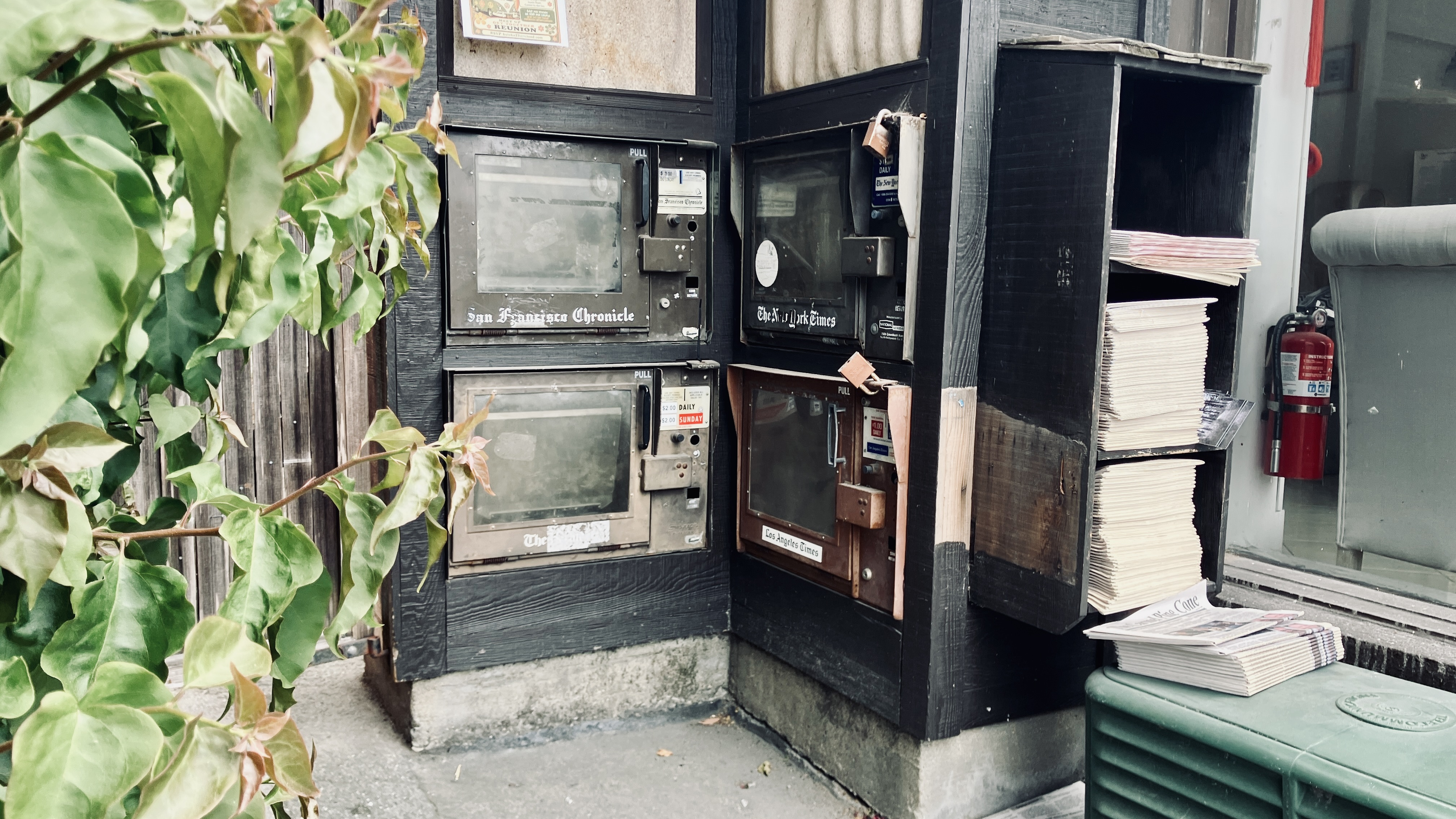
This bank of newspaper dispensers, in the alley behind the Carmel-by-the-Sea Post Office, sits empty. Meanwhile, in the box on the right, the Carmel Pine Cone and Monterey County Weekly are freely distributed and see wide readership.

On August 16, 2014, the Herald moved into its new headquarters at 2200 Garden Road. On January 15, 2016, Affiliated Media, Inc., the parent company of MediaNews, filed for bankruptcy protection in Delaware. Despite that, Singleton said that all but one of MediaNews' companies were profitable. As part of the bankruptcy case, Hearst was able to secure warrants convertible to MediaNews stock.

By February 2016, layoffs had reduced the total size of the Herald's staff to six reporters responsible for a total area of 3,800 square miles.

In 2019, Alden Global Capital, the New York hedge fund behind Affiliated Media, MediaNews, and Digital First, attempted to acquire Gannett, owner of the Salinas Californian.

During the COVID-19 pandemic, Alden Global Capital went into default on payments for several large buildings in major cities in the United States. With Alden Global refusing to pay the rent on several buildings housing newspapers, those newspapers were sued by their landlords for default, and their physical buildings were permanently closed, including; The Allentown Morning Call, The Annapolis Capital Gazette, The Orlando Sentinel and The New York Daily News. Those that survived are now solely published by remote workers.

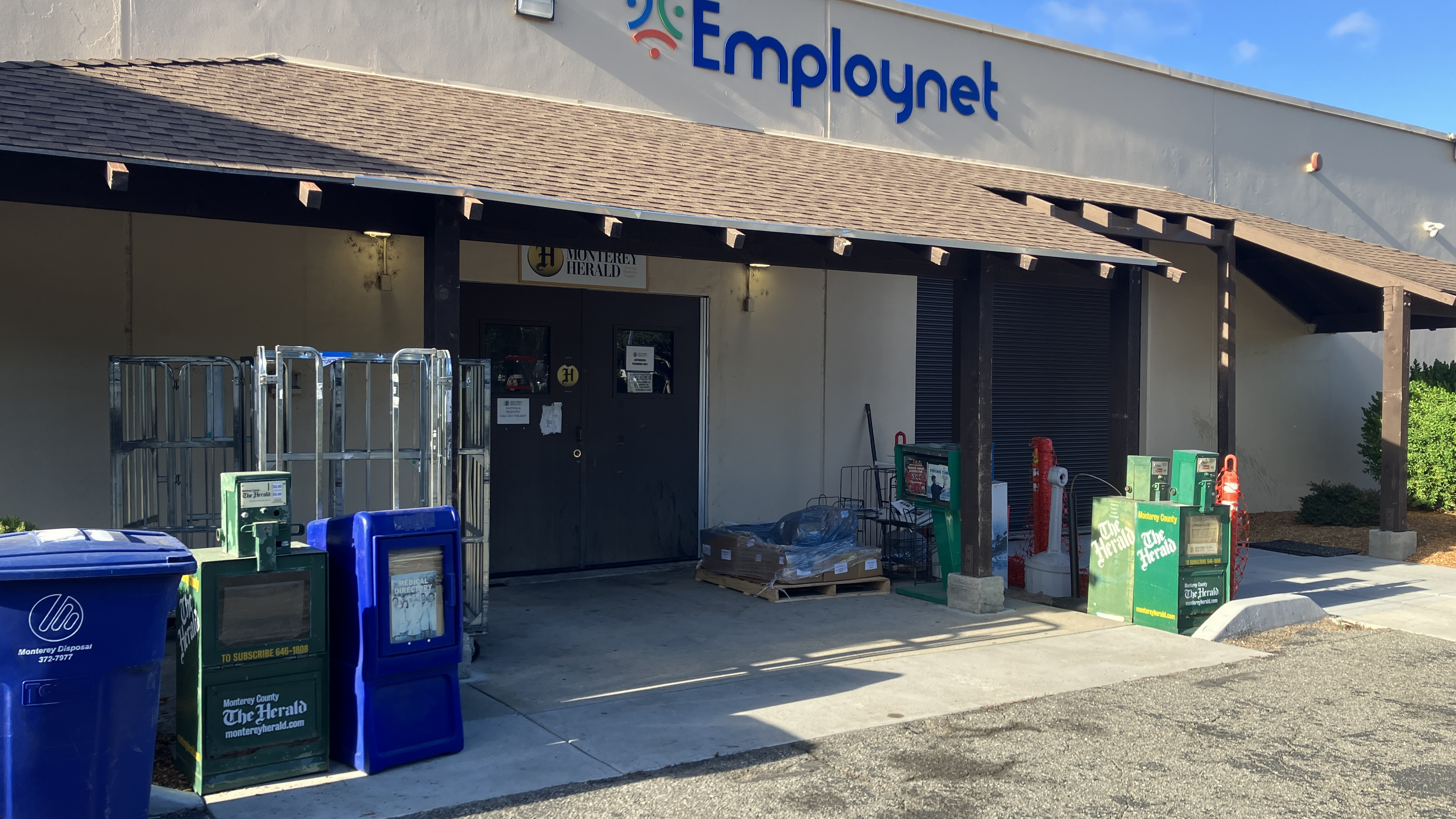
Around 2021, the Herald moved into this rented building at 2555 Garden Road. It is possible that journalists work here, but as of July 2026, no visitors are allowed, no news tips are accepted here, and no visitor parking is permitted.

Royal Caulkins, former editor of the Herald, in 2019, wrote of Digital First:

"Digital First Media... is operated by the mysterious Alden Global Capital hedge fund based in New York that answers to no one except its investors. The only answers the investors seem to care about are decent financial returns. Make that indecent returns... In absolute dollars, profits have declined over the past couple of decades but as papers and chains have changed hands at bargain basement prices, the return on investment has remained healthy because of gigantic cuts in personnel."

On March 15, 2019, the Herald published a story in which it revealed that property developers Keith and Jannette Slama were looking to redevelop the block on Garden Road, including their own office building. They attempted to contact Keith Slama at his office, but he did not reply.

Around 2021, the Herald's offices at 2200 Garden Road were vacated, and the Herald moved to 2555 Garden Road. They rent this building and do not allow visitors.

== See also ==
- Ed Ricketts
