= Heath Freeman =

Heath Freeman may refer to:

- Heath Freeman (actor) (1980–2021), American actor
- Heath Freeman (businessman) (born c. 1979), American businessman
