= Daily Herald (Arlington Heights, Illinois) =

American daily newspaper (founded 1871)

- March 2, 2012 front page
- Type: Daily newspaper
- Format: Broadsheet
- Owner(s): Tribune Publishing (Alden Global Capital)
- Founded: 1871
- OCLC number: 18030507
- Website: dailyherald.com

The Daily Herald is a daily newspaper based in Arlington Heights, Illinois, a suburb of Chicago. The newspaper is distributed in the northern, northwestern and western suburbs of Chicago. It is the namesake of the Daily Herald Media Group, a Tribune Publishing entity.

The paper started in 1871 and was independently owned and run by four generations of the Paddock family. In 2018, the Paddock family sold its stake in the paper to its employees through an employee stock ownership plan. In May 2026, the paper was acquired by Alden Global Capital's Tribune Publishing division, owner of the Chicago Tribune.

== Areas of circulation ==
The Daily Herald serves Cook, DuPage, Kane, Lake, and McHenry counties. It is the third-largest newspaper in Illinois (behind the Chicago Tribune and Chicago Sun-Times).

== History ==
The Daily Herald was founded in 1872 as the Cook County Herald. It was initially tailored to the business needs of the then-rural northwestern portion of Cook County. Hosea C. Paddock, a former teacher, bought the newspaper in 1889 for $175. His sons, Stuart and Charles, took over the paper in 1920 and renamed it the Arlington Heights Herald in 1926. For its first century, it was a weekly publication.

In 1898, Hosea Paddock bought the Palatine Enterprise. Over the years, the Paddocks bought newspapers in Mount Prospect, Bensenville, Roselle and Wheeling. The Daily Herald counts 1898 as its founding date.

The paper grew along with northwestern Cook County after World War II, as four-lane highways and the expansion of the Chicago and North Western's commuter rail line in the northwest suburbs (now the Union Pacific Northwest Line) turned it into a suburban area. It became a tri-weekly in 1967.

The paper's real growth began in 1968, when Stuart Paddock Jr. took over the paper. A year later, the paper began publishing five days a week. This move came almost out of necessity; Field Communications, publisher of the Chicago Sun-Times, had introduced its "Day" papers for the northern suburbs in 1966. A brutal one-year circulation war ensued, ending in 1970 when Field pulled out of the area. That year, the paper dropped Arlington Heights from its masthead after merging with its sister publications and expanding into Lake County. It began publishing on Saturdays in 1975. It became the Daily Herald in 1977 and began publishing on Sundays in 1978. During the second half of the 1980s, it expanded into DuPage, Kane and McHenry counties. Its growth has continued to this day. Stuart Paddock Jr. died in 2002.

Today, the Daily Herald's motto is, "Big Picture, Local Focus" because it covers both international and national news as well as news local to its circulation area.

The Daily Herald was made partially employee-owned in 1972, but the Paddock family transferred their interest to the paper's employee stock ownership plan in 2018 as part of their effort to ensure the paper remains locally owned. In May 2026, the paper was acquired by Alden Global Capital's Tribune Publishing division, owner of the Chicago Tribune. The sale price was $24 million. In September 2026, the newsroom staff voted 15-0 in favor of unionizing.

== Bibliography ==
- "June 2013 Top Media Outlets: Newspapers, Blogs, Consumer Magazines, Broadcast, Websites & Social Networks" (PDF). BurrellesLuce. June 2013. Archived from the original (PDF) on January 4, 2015.
- "Daily Herald: About Us". Daily Herald. Arlington Heights, Illinois. Archived from the original on October 17, 2000.
