= Edward Kennedy (journalist) =

American journalist (1905–1963)

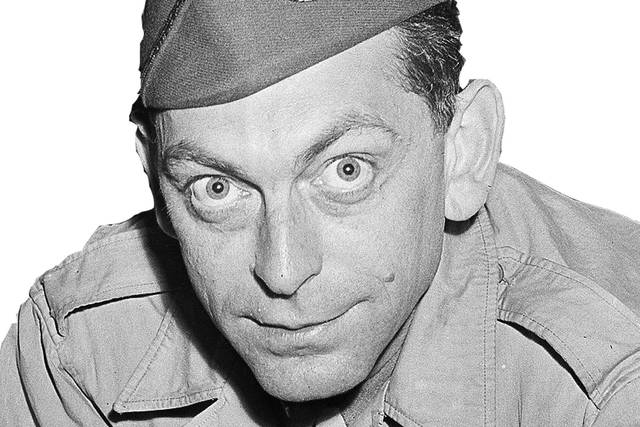
- Born: June 26, 1905; New York, New York
- Died: November 29, 1963 (aged 58); Monterey, California
- Resting place: San Carlos Cemetery
- Publications; Associated Press; The New York Times; The Atlantic Monthly; Santa Barbara News-Press; Monterey Herald

Edward L. Kennedy (June 26, 1905 – November 29, 1963) was an American journalist best known for being the first Allied newsman to report the German surrender at the end of World War II, getting the word to the Associated Press in London before the surrender had been officially announced by Supreme Allied Headquarters. This angered Allied commanders who had imposed a 36-hour news embargo before their official surrender announcement. After being forced stateside, Kennedy was fired by the AP for his actions. In 2012, the Associated Press apologized for this, saying "It was handled in the worst possible way."

== Breaking the news ==
The documents for Germany's surrender in World War II were signed on May 7, 1945, at 2:41 a.m. local time at General Dwight D. Eisenhower's headquarters in Reims, France. The surrender was subject to a time delay to ensure compliance across the entire theater, and was to take effect at 23.01 on May 8. Edward Kennedy, as the AP's Paris bureau chief, had been among a group of reporters hastily assembled aboard a C-47 aircraft, and told only when aloft that they were to cover the official signing. All of the journalists on the plane were asked to pledge that they would embargo the story until SHAEF had issued its own official announcement of the event; Kennedy complied. After the ceremony, however, the public relations officers told the reporters that instead of a few hours of embargo, they were being asked by Eisenhower to hold the news for 36 more hours until after a second surrender ceremony, this one to take place in Berlin, the German capital. The military officials explained that it was deemed important that the surrender be made by the heads of the German Armed Forces, not merely their representatives, and that the Germans formally surrender to the Soviets, as well as the Western Allies, something the Nazis were trying to avoid.

After a German radio station in Allied-controlled Flensburg broadcast the news, however, Kennedy believed that military censors must have allowed it. Evading wartime censorship, he phoned the AP bureau in London and reported the surrender. The story moved on the AP wire at 9:36 a.m. EST, mid-afternoon in France.

The official announcements of the surrender varied from German foreign minister Lutz Graf Schwerin von Krosigk early May 7, to Winston Churchill on May 8, and Joseph Stalin on May 9 (accounting for the Soviet Victory Day). The formal cessation of hostilities was at 23:01 hours on May 8.

== Aftermath ==
Kennedy would later write that he had respected previous embargoes because they were related to military security, but that the embargo of the surrender news was simply political. Kennedy himself had witnessed Soviet General Ivan Susloparov sign the instruments of surrender in Reims. He concluded, correctly, that the Soviets were insisting on a formal signing ceremony in Berlin for what amounted to propaganda reasons, and the Allies had agreed to wait until that took place to appease Stalin. (It would later emerge that Susloparov had asked Moscow for instructions about signing, but did not receive a response before the first ceremony; when the Soviet command did reply, Susloparov was ordered not to sign.)

But the final straw for Kennedy was that SHAEF had permitted the captive German military command to publicly broadcast their notice of surrender to their own forces the day before; at that point, Kennedy decided, SHAEF had in effect announced the surrender. He wrote: "since Supreme Headquarters had released the news through the Germans, I felt under no further obligation to observe the gag."

Opinion on Kennedy's action was divided; some of his own colleagues, at least partly because they had been scooped, insisted that he be deaccredited. Supporters pointed to the freedom of the press, but the AP eventually apologized. SHAEF disaccredited Kennedy and the AP returned him to New York. Initially Kennedy was kept on the payroll but given no work to do, eventually being fired in November. The following summer, the military acknowledged that SHAEF had not simply permitted the German broadcast, but ordered it, and that it had been made almost two hours before Kennedy's dispatch.

Kennedy's story was accurate, but he had violated the military's strict embargo. Both the military and other reporters were angry with him. Two days after The New York Times ran his story as the lead item, the Times wrote an editorial saying Kennedy had committed a "grave disservice to the newspaper profession." According to Time, the incident gave the press a black eye and "strengthened the censor's hand".

In 1948, in the August issue of The Atlantic Monthly, Kennedy published a personal essay about the embargo event explaining his side of the story. The essay was titled, "I'd Do It Again". In it he wrote: "The mass of Americans took the view that once the war in Europe was over they had a right to know it. They had perception enough to see through the accusations of correspondents beaten on a story, and sense enough to know that lives are not endangered by announcing the end of hostilities; they may be lost by withholding the announcement."

== Later life ==
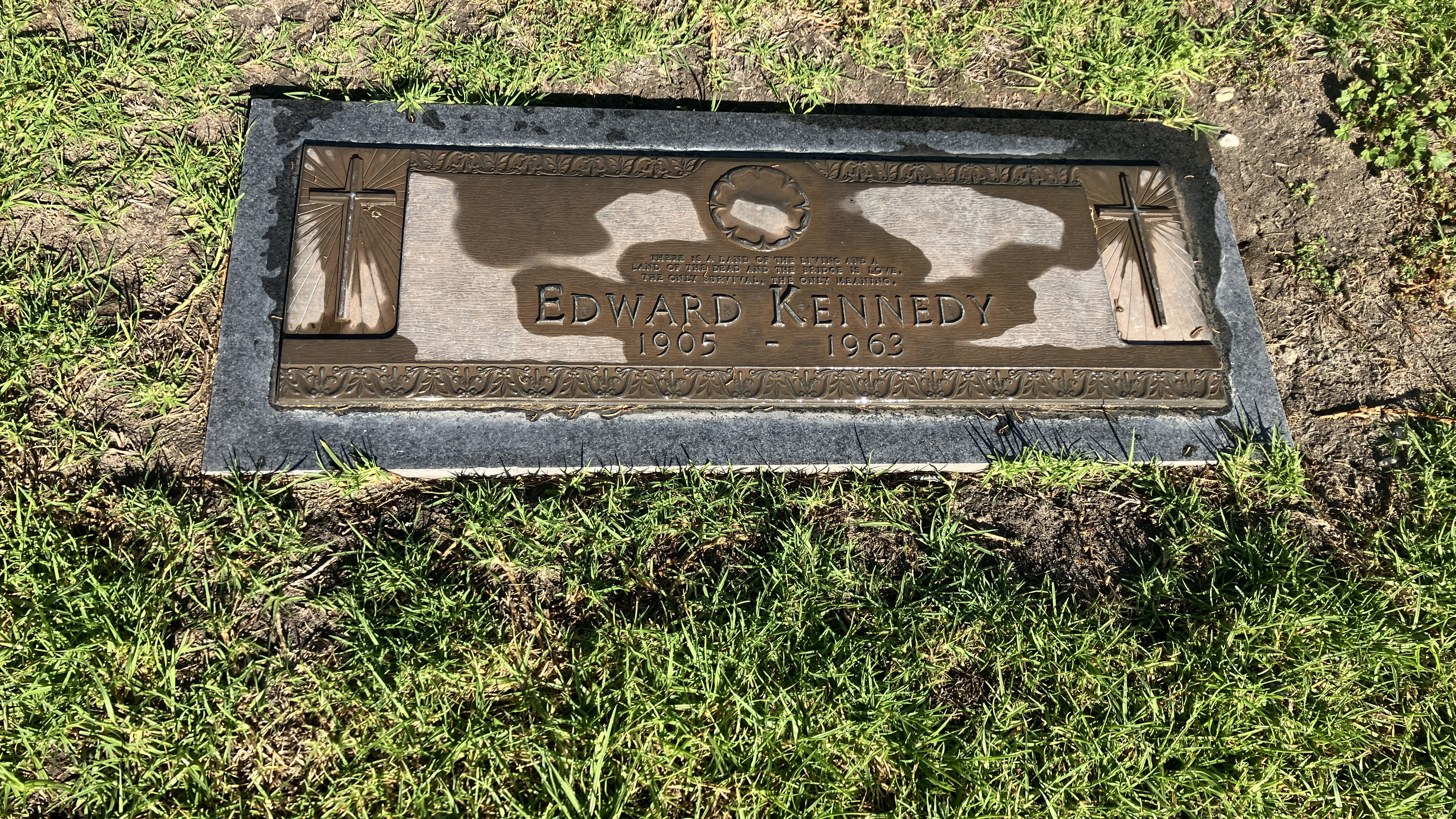
Gravestone in San Carlos Cemetery.

After the war Kennedy became the managing editor of the Santa Barbara News-Press, and three years later in 1949 he was hired by The Monterey Peninsula Herald as the associate editor, eventually serving as editor and associate publisher. Kennedy was struck by a car on November 24, 1963, and died five days later at the age of 58. A monument to Kennedy stands in Laguna Grande Park in Seaside, California, with an inscription referring to his famous scoop: "He gave the world an extra day of happiness."

During his later years, Kennedy composed a memoir of his years as a World War II correspondent but was not able to locate a publishing company. His accounts were eventually published in 2012 by his daughter, Julia Kennedy Cochran, under the title Ed Kennedy's War: V-E Day, Censorship & The Associated Press, which chronicled his early days as a stringer in Paris to his firing from the Associated Press.

== Memoir and AP's apology ==
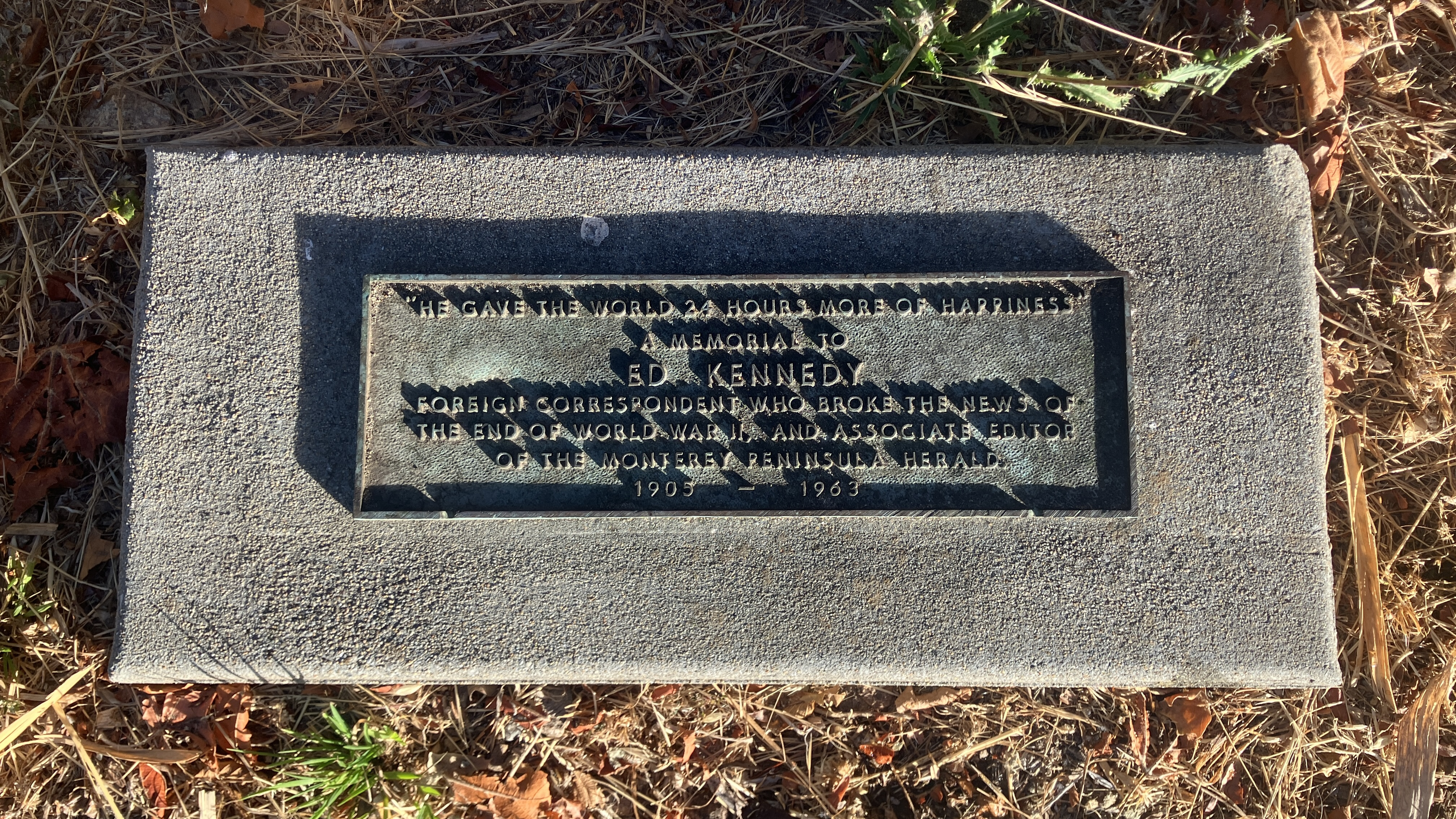
Memorial plaque in Seaside, California, in Laguna Grande Park, across the street from the Seaside Library.

In 2012, Louisiana State University Press published Kennedy's memoir, Ed Kennedy's War: V-E Day, Censorship, and the Associated Press. Associated Press President Tom Curley co-wrote an introduction to the book and apologized for the way the company treated Kennedy, telling an AP reporter, "It was a terrible day for the AP. It was handled in the worst possible way." Kennedy, Curley wrote, "did everything just right." According to his daughter, Julia Kennedy Cochran of Bend, Oregon, Kennedy had long sought such public vindication from his old employer. "The AP, after 67 years, is finally apologizing for firing my father", Cochran said. "He was really a hero and should have got a lot more credit."

In 2015, the film Le grand secret, directed by Christophe Remy, about Kennedy and his story, was released in France.

== See also ==
- Victory in Europe Day
- German Instrument of Surrender
