= Bryan Tower =

Skyscraper in Dallas, Texas, U.S.

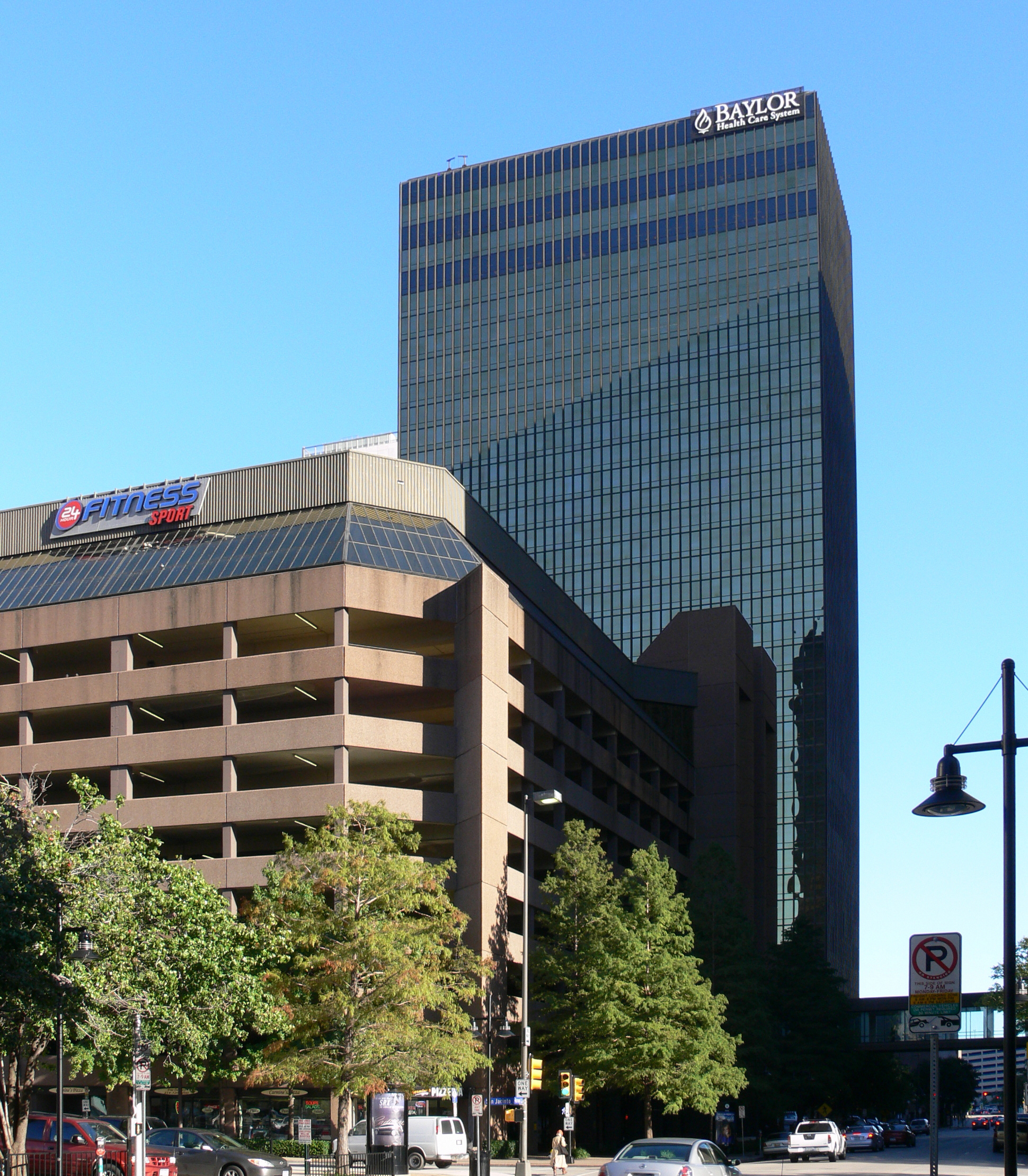
- Bryan Tower in 2009

Record height
- Tallest in Dallas (19th) since 1973^{[I]}
- Preceded by: Harwood Center

General information
- Type: Office
- Location: 2001 Bryan Street, Dallas, Texas, U.S.
- Coordinates: 32°47′07″N 96°47′47″W
- Construction started: 1970
- Completed: 1973
- Opening: 1973
- Landlord: Bryan Tower Holdings, LLC

Height
- Roof: 512 ft (156 m)

Technical details
- Floor count: 41+
- Floor area: 1,172,560 sq ft (108,934 m^{2})

Design and construction
- Architect: Neuhaus & Taylor
- Developer: Trammell Crow
- Main contractor: The Beck Group

The Bryan Tower is a skyscraper in Dallas, Texas, United States. The building rises 512 ft (156 m). It contains 40 floors, and was completed in 1973. The Bryan Tower currently stands as the 19th-tallest building in the city. The architect who designed the building was Neuhaus & Taylor. The building is known for its distinctive gold-tinted windows and the steel beams that run up and down the building. The tower was listed on the National Register of Historic Places in 2024.

In 1998, Randall D. Smith acquired the Bryan Tower, and his son Caleb Smith oversaw the renovation for his father's company Spire Realty, which he now runs.

== In popular culture ==
Exterior shots of the building were used as the home of Ewing Oil in the original 5-part miniseries Dallas, now referred to as Season One of the popular 1980s television series Dallas.
