= Russ Smith (publisher) =

Newspaper publisher and columnist

- Born: 1955 (age 70–71); Huntington, New York, U.S.
- Occupations: Newspaper publisher and columnist
- Known for: Founder of Baltimore City Paper, Washington City Paper and New York Press
- Relatives: Randall D. Smith (brother)

Russ Smith (born 1955) is an American newspaper publisher and columnist best known for founding the Baltimore City Paper, Washington City Paper and New York Press.

After selling the Baltimore and Washington City Papers for $4 million, Smith founded New York Press in 1989. Like his previous papers, the press was an alternative weekly. It became a caustic rival with the well-established Village Voice.

In 2002 Avalon Equity Partners, publisher of a chain of gay alternative weeklies including the New York Blade and the Washington Blade, purchased the paper from Smith, although they continued to publish his 10,000+ word weekly column, MUGGER. From 2003 to 2006, Smith wrote a column called "Right Field" for the Baltimore City Paper.

A libertarian Republican (he is an advocate of the legalization of prostitution, gambling, same-sex marriage, and currently illegal drugs), Smith is a contributor to The Wall Street Journal's editorial page, a position that he has held since 1999; he also writes for the paper's "Taste" section. Other publications Smith has written for include Baltimore's Press Box, The New York Sun, and Jewish World Review.

In March 2008, Smith founded the website Splice Today, which features a variety of authors including Crispin Sartwell, William Bryk, and Mark Judge. The site covers an eclectic range of topics, with particular emphasis on politics and the arts. Smith writes articles for the site regularly. These pieces are usually politics-centric or personal essays.
