= The Sam Houston Hotel =

Historic hotel in Houston, Texas, U.S.

- U.S. National Register of Historic Places
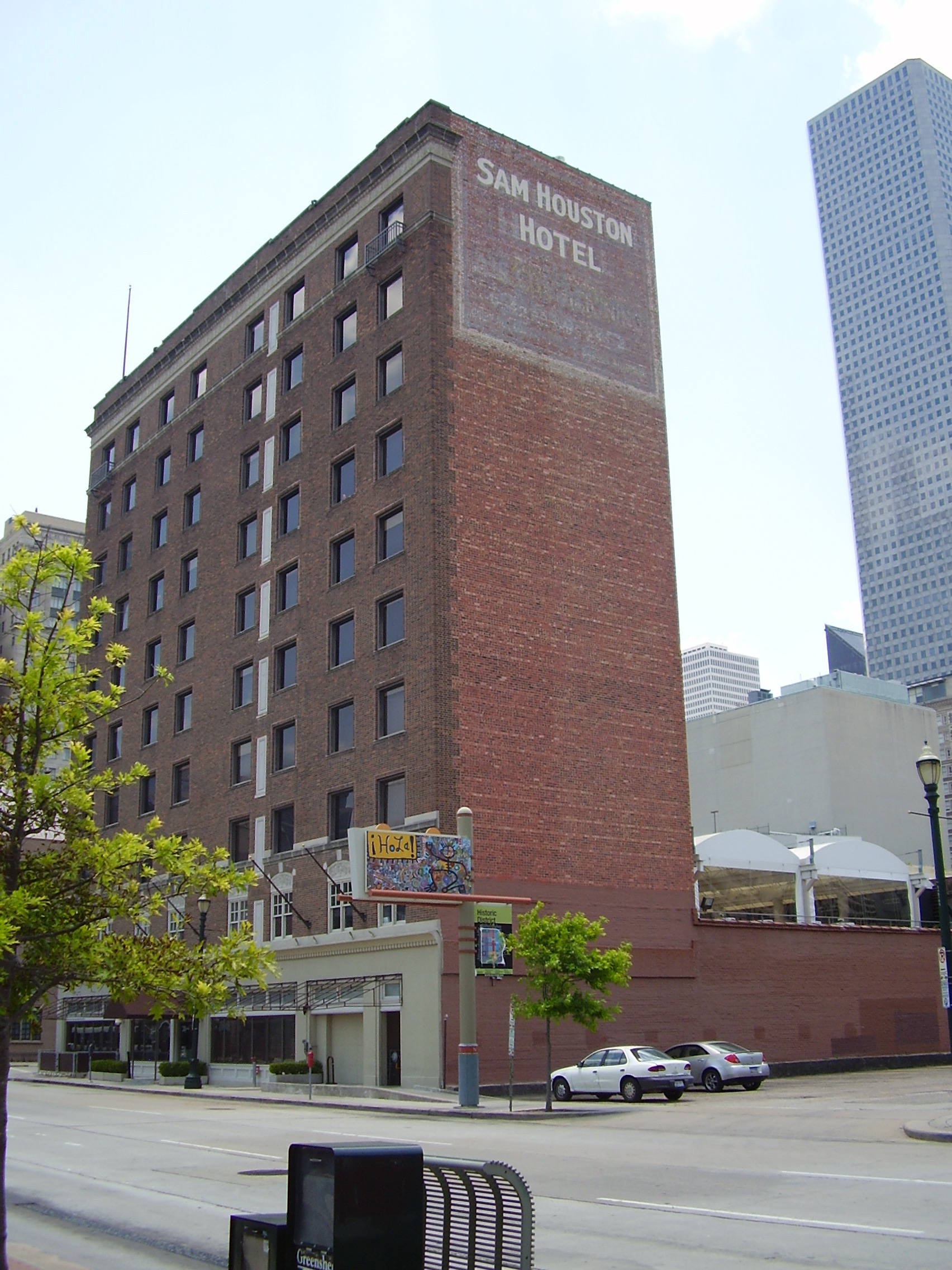

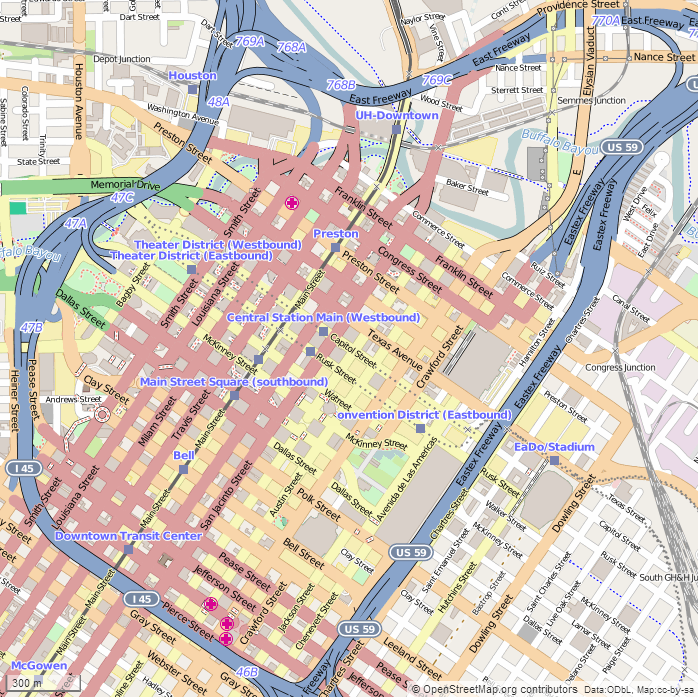
- Location within Houston Downtown Location within Texas Location within the United States
- Location: Houston, Texas, United States
- Coordinates: 29°45′42″N 95°21′37″W
- Area: Downtown Houston
- Built: 1924
- Architect: Sanguinet, Staats, Hedrick & Gottlie; Don Hall
- NRHP reference No.: 02000276
- Added to NRHP: April 17, 2002

The Sam Houston Hotel is a historic hotel in Downtown Houston, Texas, United States that is listed in the National Register of Historic Places. The hotel received its listing on April 17, 2002.

The Sam Houston Hotel Company built the hotel in 1924 to cater to the budget minded business traveler. It was designed by the firm Sanguinet, Staats, Hedrick & Gottlieb. The hotel operated until the 1970s by owners William and Vonnie Brooks.

In 2002, it was bought by Randall D. Smith, his wife Barbara Stovall Smith (a Houston native), and his brother Jeffrey Smith, who extensively remodelled it and rebranded it in 2005 as the Alden Hotel, as the owners hoped to expand the Alden brand to other cities. The hotel offers 100 rooms and suites.

In 2010, the ownership of the Alden Houston formally transferred to Northwood Investors. In 2012, Northwood sold the hotel to American Liberty Hospitality and Gentry Mills Capital and returned to its original name as The Sam Houston Hotel. It underwent a renovation in 2013.

== See also ==
- Downtown Houston
