= Randall D. Smith =

US hedge fund manager

Randy Smith
- Born: Randall Duncan Smith; 1942 (age 83–84)
- Education: Cornell University (BA); University of Pennsylvania (MBA)
- Spouses: Kathryn Smith (died); Barbara Stovall
- Relatives: Russ Smith (brother) Blondshell (granddaughter)

Randall Duncan "Randy" Smith (born 1942) is an American hedge fund manager who is the founder and chief of investments of Alden Global Capital. Smith is known as a pioneer of vulture capitalism, the purchase and dismantling of distressed firms.

== Early life ==
Smith was born in 1942. He earned a bachelor's degree from Cornell University in 1965, followed by an MBA from the Wharton School of the University of Pennsylvania in 1967.

His younger brother Russ Smith founded the Baltimore City Paper and the Washington City Paper, which he sold for $4 million, and in 1989 founded the New York Press.

== Career ==
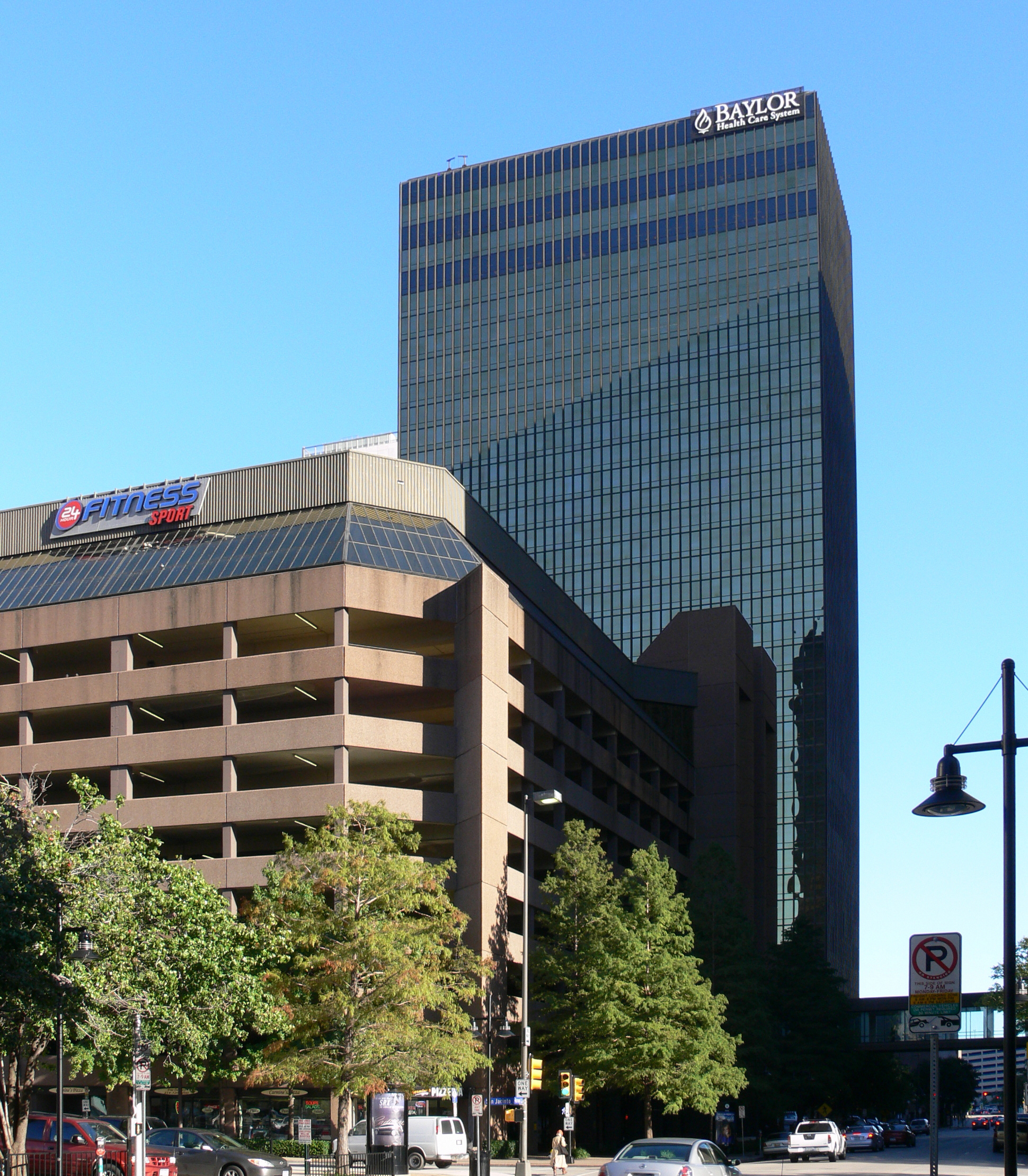
Bryan Tower, Dallas

Smith was a partner at Bear Stearns from 1975 to 1996, where he founded the convertible arbitrage department and later focused on investing in distressed assets. The New York Times, in a 1991 article titled "Bottom Fishing with R.D. Smith" reported on conflicts of interest while Smith was at Bear Stearns.

He started his first investment firm at home while still working for Bear Stearns, with $20,000 he and his wife won in the late 1960s on Dream House, a television game show.

In 2005, Smith settled claims from a court-appointed bankruptcy trustee associated with an investment in Hawaiian Airlines.

=== Real estate ===
In 1998, Smith acquired the Bryan Tower, a 40-story downtown office building in Dallas, Texas. His son Caleb Smith oversaw the renovation for his father's company Spire Realty, which he now runs.

In 2002, together with his second wife Barbara (a Houston native), and his brother Jeffrey Smith, Randy Smith bought the historic 100-room 1924 Sam Houston Hotel, extensively remodelled it, and reopened it in 2005 as the Alden Hotel. In 2010, the ownership of the Alden Houston formally transferred to Northwood Investors. In 2012, Northwood sold the hotel to American Liberty Hospitality and Gentry Mills Capital and returned to its original name as The Sam Houston Hotel.

Smith and his wife Barbara own sixteen residential investment properties in the Palm Beach, Florida area through limited liability companies, properties from which they draw rental income.

=== Alden Global Capital ===
In 2007, Smith founded Alden Global Capital, and is its chief of investments. As of May 2021, Alden Global is the second-largest newspaper publisher in the United States.

Alden has a reputation for sharply cutting costs by reducing the number of journalists working on its newspapers. Writing in The Atlantic, McKay Coppins has criticized Smith and Alden co-founder Heath Freeman, saying "no one has been more mercenary or less interested in pretending to care about their publications' long-term health."

== Personal life ==
He met his first wife, Kathryn Smith, when both were Cornell students, and she earned a PhD in political science. They have a son, Caleb Smith, who was profiled in 2011 in the Dallas-based D Magazine, and a daughter, Abigail (d. 2018). Kathryn Smith died of ovarian cancer.

He is married to Barbara Stovall Smith.
