= Ryan Ranch =

- U.S. National Register of Historic Places
- U.S. Historic district
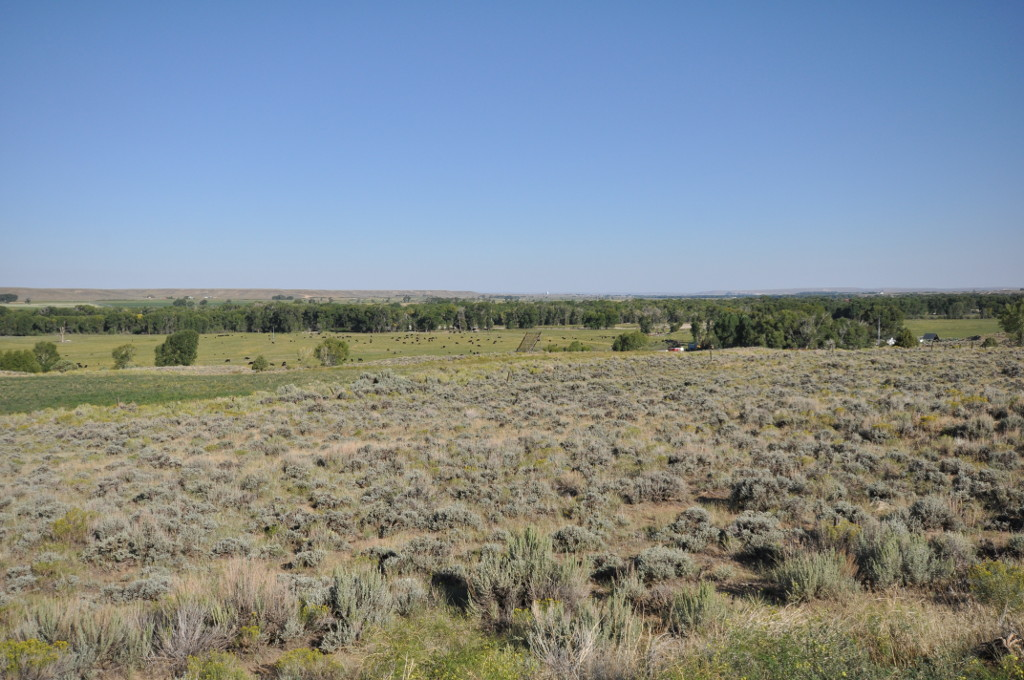

- Location within Wyoming
- Nearest city: Saratoga, Wyoming
- Coordinates: 41°22′21″N 106°43′01″W
- Area: 150 acres (61 ha)
- Built: 1874
- Architectural style: Log Cabin style
- NRHP reference No.: 78002823
- Added to NRHP: March 29, 1978

The Ryan Ranch is a 2,000-acre (810 ha) ranch on the east bank of the North Platte River in Carbon County, Wyoming, about 8 miles (13 km) south of Saratoga. One of the oldest ranches in the Platte Valley of central Wyoming, it was founded by Barton T. Ryan in 1874 and expanded by his son Cecil A. Ryan. The ranch headquarters comprises 17 structures arranged around a barnyard. The oldest structure is the 1875 homestead. Other buildings include sheds, shops, guest cabins, barns, trailers and a privy.

Barton T. Ryan was born in Brookville, Indiana on July 29, 1838, and grew up in Burlington, Iowa. After Army service during the American Civil War he organized a cavalry unit in which he served for three years and eventually commanded. As part of his cavalry service he came under the command of General Alfred Sully in operations against the Sioux. After leaving the Army he operated a sawmill at Fort Reno. After Fort Reno was abandoned in 1868 Ryan moved the equipment to Fort Steele on the North Platte. In 1870 Ryan returned to Burlington to marry Mary Law Ridding. They returned to Fort Steele the same year and by 1874 had established a homestead at the ranch site. Ryan went into partnership with John W. Hugus and developed a herd of as many as 7000 cattle. He also continued to operate sawmills. In politics he was Carbon County Attorney in 1872, County Assessor in 1874 and County Commissioner in 1878. He was a member of the Rawlins and Saratoga Masonic lodges.

The Ryan Ranch was placed on the National Register of Historic Places on March 29, 1978. Only the headquarters section of the ranch is included in the designated area, amounting to 150 acres (61 ha) of the ranch.
