= Alden Global Capital =

American private equity firm

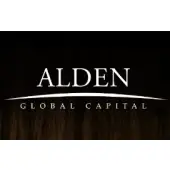
- Type: Division
- Industry: Investment management
- Founded: 2007; 19 years ago
- Founder: Randall D. Smith
- Headquarters: Lipstick Building, New York City, U.S.
- Key people: Heath Freeman
- Products: Alternative Investments
- AUM: US$1.04 billion
- Number of employees: 15
- Parent: Smith Management LLC
- Website: aldenglobal.com

Alden Global Capital is a private equity firm based in Manhattan, New York City, with a focus on newspapers. It was founded in 2007 by Randall D. Smith, and is a division of Smith Management LLC. Its managing director is Heath Freeman. By mid-2020, Alden had stakes in roughly 200 American newspapers. The company added more newspapers to its portfolio in May 2021 when it purchased Tribune Publishing and became the second largest newspaper publisher in the United States.

The company operates its media holdings through Digital First Media, which it acquired in 2010 after DFM's parent company, MediaNews Group, declared bankruptcy. With its acquisition of Tribune Publishing in May 2021, Alden is collectively the second-largest owner of newspapers in the United States, as calculated by average daily print circulation, second only to Gannett.

In November 2021, Alden Global Capital made an offer to purchase Lee Enterprises for $24 a share in cash, or about $141 million. Lee owns daily newspapers in 77 markets in 26 states, and about 350 weekly and specialty publications.

Newspapers in Alden's portfolio include Chicago Tribune, The Denver Post, the St. Paul Pioneer Press, the Boston Herald, The Mercury News, East Bay Times, The Orange County Register, and Orlando Sentinel.

Alden has a reputation for cutting costs by reducing the number of journalists working on its newspapers, leading to media criticism.

== Origins ==
According to a 2008 filing with the Securities and Exchange Commission, Alden is a division of Smith Management LLC. The company has its origins in R.D. Smith & Company, a firm founded by Randall Duncan Smith, initially using the $20,000 cash prize he and his wife won on the 1968-1970 gameshow Dream House. In 1991, The New York Times described R.D. Smith & Company's business as "profiting from other people's misery by trading the stock and debt of troubled companies."

== Acquisitions ==
=== MediaNews Group ===
Under the acquisition plan, MediaNews Group debt fell to $165 million from about $930 million. Senior lenders under the deal were to swap debt for stock. MediaNews Group came out of bankruptcy in March 2010 under the majority ownership of its lenders. The appointees to the MediaNews board were replaced by new directors representing the stockholders group led by Alden Global Capital. Several interim executive positions were also filled by people related to Alden or its parent, Smith Management LLC.

=== Tribune Publishing ===
In May 2021, Tribune Publishing finalized its sale to Alden, after having announced in February 2021 that it intended to pursue this path. Alden's purchase price was $635 million, or $17.25 per share. Tribune Publishing published nine major metropolitan dailies. These included the Chicago Tribune, the New York Daily News, and The Baltimore Sun. The Daily News was transferred by Alden into a separate Alden-owned company, Daily News Enterprises, upon the close of the deal. Alden first became involved with Tribune Publishing in 2019, when they paid $117.9 million to Michael Ferro for his 25.2-percent stake.

Alden sold The Baltimore Sun in January 2024 to David D. Smith, executive chairman of Sinclair Inc. The purchase price was not immediately disclosed.

=== Attempted acquisition of Gannett ===
In 2019, Alden attempted but failed at a hostile takeover of Gannett.

=== Attempted acquisition of Lee Enterprises ===
Alden purchased a 5.9-percent stake in Lee Enterprises in January 2020. Lee Enterprises owns 77 daily newspapers, including the Buffalo News, Omaha World-Herald and the Tulsa World.

In November 2021, Alden made an offer to Lee to purchase the company in its entirety for roughly $141 million.

In response, the board of Lee Enterprises enacted a shareholder rights plan, colloquially known as a "poison pill", in order to ward off the purchase attempt. The specific shareholder rights plan adopted by the Lee board forbids Alden from purchasing more than 10% of the company, and will be in force for one year. The rationale offered by the board was, "Consistent with its fiduciary duties, Lee's Board has taken this action to ensure our shareholders receive fair treatment, full transparency and protection in connection with Alden's unsolicited proposal to acquire Lee."

In early December, the board of Lee unanimously rejected the Alden bid, saying that the Alden proposal "grossly undervalues Lee and fails to recognize the strength of our business today." Shortly thereafter, Alden Global, through its operating unit Strategic Investment Opportunities, filed a lawsuit in state court in Delaware against Lee Enterprises. The Alden lawsuit asserts that the members of the Lee board "have every reason to maintain the status quo and their lucrative corporate positions" and that they are "focused more on [their] own power than what's best for the company."

In mid-February 2022, the Delaware court found in favor of Lee Enterprises. In the face of that setback, Alden said it would turn to the tactic of filing a proxy statement asking the company's shareholders to vote no on board members Mary Junck and Herbert Moloney during the March 2022 board elections. This attempt also failed, as shareholders returned both directors to the Lee board despite Alden's opposition.

== Real estate holdings ==
Alden Global Capital includes a real estate division called Twenty Lake Holdings, which primarily buys excess real estate from newspapers. In 2019, Twenty Lake Holdings reported that it had acquired about 180 properties with 2.3 million square feet of real estate in 29 states.

In 2022, Twenty Lake acquired the remaining 33 bus stations owned by Greyhound Lines. The firm subsequently began selling the properties for real estate development after closing the stations.

Alden also owns Homes of America, a company buying up trailer parks in WV and VA.

== Impact on newspapers ==
Alden Global Capital's management of American newspapers has been heavily criticized. In 2018, Margaret Sullivan of The Washington Post described Alden as "seemingly intent on destroying local newspapers." Writing for Bloomberg, Joe Nocera similarly described Alden and its president, Heath Freeman, as "a destroyer of newspapers". In 2020, Joe Pompeo pilloried Alden in Vanity Fair for reducing newsrooms, writing that "Alden Global Capital has eliminated the jobs of scores of reporters and editors, and decimated journalism in cities all over the country: Denver, Boston, San Jose, Trenton, etc. Next up: Chicago, Baltimore, and the New York Daily News."

In 2021, The Atlantic examined the impact of Alden's acquisition of the Chicago Tribune, noting that, "The new owners did not fly to Chicago to address the staff, nor did they bother with paeans to the vital civic role of journalism. Instead, they gutted the place."

The company has also been criticized for investing money for pensions of newspaper employees in funds it manages itself.

== In popular media ==
The 2024 film Stripped for Parts: American Journalism on the Brink centers on the impact of Alden Global Capital in the deconstruction of the American news business.

The documentary details how Alden Global Capital has decimated the newspaper industry through the eyes of affected journalists. It streamed on PBS from October 2025 to December 2025.
