= Heath Freeman (businessman) =

Managing director of Alden Global Capital

Heath Freeman (born 1979/1980) is the managing director of Alden Global Capital, the owner of Digital First Media. Freeman is said to be publicity-shy, but has attracted national interest because of his role at Alden which, as of 2021, owns the second largest portfolio of American newspapers (second only to Gannett).

== Education ==
Freeman received his undergraduate degree from Duke University in 2002.

While attending Duke, he was a walk-on place-kicker on Duke's football team. He was active at Duke in its Freeman Center for Jewish Life, and was a member of the fraternity Delta Sigma Phi.

== Career ==
After graduating from Duke, Freeman went to work at the Peter J. Solomon Company.

=== At Alden ===
Freeman co-founded Alden Global Capital with Randall D. Smith when he was 26. Alden has been criticized for its acquisitions of newspapers followed by major staff cuts; McKay Coppins described Freeman and Smith, saying "no one has been more mercenary or less interested in pretending to care about their publications’ long-term health."

=== Restaurants ===
Freeman is said to be passionate about food. He co-founded "City of Saints Coffee Roaster" which is a small chain of coffee shops. One of the shops was featured in Billions.

Freeman purchased the Harbor Bistro in East Hampton for $4 million in December 2021. He owns the EHP Resort & Marina, which includes the Si Si Mediterranean Restaurant. He owns two Buongiorno bakeries, one near the EHP Resort and another in Montauk. Freeman has also as of May 2022 reopened the Red Bar outside of Southampton and renamed it "Enchante". In addition, Freeman purchased the Inn Spot and Crash Cantina in Hampton Bays. Also in 2022, he added the restaurant Sunset Harbor to his portfolio of Hampton-based restaurants.

== Personal ==
Freeman's parents died when he was in his early 20s. His father, Brian, worked at the U.S. Treasury Department during the Jimmy Carter administration, and took his own life when Heath Freeman was 21. Freeman commented, "Their untimely deaths taught me how the world works at a very young age. It made me tend to be more of a realist."

He has two siblings, Danyelle and Amanda.
