= List of George H. W. Bush 1988 presidential campaign endorsements =

Endorsements list

This is a list of notable individuals and organizations who endorsed George H. W. Bush's campaign for president of the United States in the 1988 U.S. presidential election.

== Federal executive officials ==
=== Presidents ===
- Gerald Ford, 38th President of the United States (1974–1977)
- Ronald Reagan, 40th President of the United States (1981–1989) (despite privately supporting Bush, he remained neutral during the primaries and endorsed him only after Bush had secured enough delegates to clinch the nomination)

=== Cabinet-level officials ===
- Zbigniew Brzezinski, 9th United States National Security Advisor (1977–1981) (Democratic)
- Frederick B. Dent, 5th United States Trade Representative (1975–1977)
- James B. Edwards, 3rd United States Secretary of Energy (1981–1982)
- Alexander Haig, 59th United States Secretary of State (1981–1982)
- Clarence M. Kelley, 2nd Director of the Federal Bureau of Investigation (1973–1978)
- Jeane Kirkpatrick, 16th United States Ambassador to the United Nations (1981–1985)
- Elliot Richardson, 23rd United States Secretary of Commerce (1976–1977)

=== Ambassadors ===
- Weston Adams, United States Ambassador to Malawi (1984–1986)
- Joe M. Rodgers, United States Ambassador to France (1985–1989)
- Richard L. Walker, United States Ambassador to South Korea (1981–1986)

== U.S. Congress ==
=== U.S. Senate ===
==== Current ====
- Bob Dole, U.S. Senator from Kansas (1969–1996)
- Pete Domenici, U.S. Senator from New Mexico (1973–2009) (previously endorsed Dole)
- Daniel J. Evans, U.S. Senator from Washington (1983–1989)
- Jake Garn, U.S. Senator from Utah (1974–1993) (previously endorsed Laxalt)
- Phil Gramm, U.S. Senator from Texas (1985–2002)
- Mark Hatfield, U.S. Senator from Oregon (1967–1997)
- John Heinz, U.S. Senator from Pennsylvania (1977–1991)
- Jim McClure, U.S. Senator from Idaho (1973–1991)
- Mitch McConnell, U.S. Senator from Kentucky (1985–present)
- Bob Packwood, U.S. Senator from Oregon (1969–1995)
- William Roth, U.S. Senator from Delaware (1971–2001)
- Steve Symms, U.S. Senator from Idaho (1981–1993) (previously endorsed Dole)
- Strom Thurmond, U.S. Senator from South Carolina (1954–1956; 1956–2003)
- Lowell Weicker, U.S. Senator from Connecticut (1971–1989)

==== Former ====
- Jim Broyhill, U.S. Senator from North Carolina (1986)
- Nicholas F. Brady, U.S. Senator from New Jersey (1982)
- John Sherman Cooper, U.S. Senator from Kentucky (1946–1949; 1952–1955; 1956–1973)
- Barry Goldwater, U.S. Senator from Arizona (1953–1965; 1969–1987), 1964 Republican presidential nominee
- John Tower, U.S. Senator from Texas (1961–1985)

=== U.S. House of Representatives ===
==== Current ====
- Dick Armey, TX-26 (1985–2003)
- Robert Badham, CA-40 (1977–1989)
- Richard Baker, LA-6 (1987–2008)
- Joe Barton, TX-06 (1985–2019)
- Steve Bartlett, TX-3 (1983–1991)
- Joe Barton, TX-06 (1985–2019)
- Herb Bateman, VA-1 (1983–2000)
- Helen Delich Bentley, MD-02 (1985–1995)
- Michael Bilirakis, FL-09 (1983–2007)
- Thomas J. Bliley Jr., VA-03 (1981–2001)
- Sherwood Boehlert, NY-25 (1983–1993), NY-23 (1993–2003), NY-24 (2003–2007)
- Jim Bunning, KY-04 (1987–1999)
- Dan Burton, IN-06 (1983–2003), IN-05 (2003–2013) (previously endorsed Kemp)
- Sonny Callahan, AL-01 (1985–2003)
- William Clinger, PA-23 (1979–1993), PA-05 (1993–1997)
- Howard Coble, NC-06 (1985–2015)
- Tom Coleman, MO-6 (1976–1993)
- Larry Combest, TX-19 (1985–2003)
- Jim Courter, NJ-13 (1979–1983), NJ-12 (1983–1991) (previously endorsed Kemp)
- Silvio O. Conte, MA-01 (1959–1991)
- Lawrence Coughlin, PA-13 (1969–1993)
- Bob Davis, MI-11 (1979–1993)
- Tom DeLay, TX-22 (1985–2006)
- Mike DeWine, OH-07 (1983–1991)
- William L. Dickinson, AL-02 (1965–1993)
- Bob Dornan, CA-38 (1985–1993), CA-46 (1993–1997)
- David Dreier, CA-33 (1981–2013)
- Harris Fawell, IL-13 (1985–1999)
- Jack Fields, TX-08 (1981–1997)
- Hamilton Fish IV, NY-28 (1969–1973), NY-25th (1973–1983), NY-21 (1983–1993), NY-19 (1993–1995)
- Bill Frenzel, MN-03 (1971–1991)
- Elton Gallegly, CA-21 (1987–2013)
- Dean Gallo, NJ-11 (1985–1994)
- Benjamin Gilman, NY-26 (1973–1983), NY-22 (1983–1993), NY-20 (1993–2003)
- Bill Goodling, PA-19 (1975–2001)
- Bill Gradison, OH-01 (1975–1983), OH-02 (1983–1993)
- Steve Gunderson, WI-03 (1981–1997) (previously endorsed Dole)
- Thomas J. Bliley Jr., VA-03 (1981–1993), VA-07 (1993–2001)
- Judd Gregg, NH-02 (1975–1993)
- John Paul Hammerschmidt, AR-03 (1967–1993)
- Jim Hansen, UT-01 (1981–2003)
- Paul B. Henry, MI-05 (1985–1993)
- Larry J. Hopkins, KY-06 (1979–1993)
- Frank Horton, NY-36 (1963–1973), NY-34 (1973–1983), NY-29 (1983–1993)
- Andy Ireland, FL-08 (1977–1983), FL-10 (1983–1993) (previously endorsed Dole)
- Nancy Johnson, CT-06 (1983–2003), CT-05 (2003–2007)
- Jack Kemp, NY-39 (1971–1973), NY-38 (1973–1983), NY-31 (1983–1989)
- Robert Lagomarsino, CA-19 (1974–1993)
- Del Latta, OH-05 (1959–1989)
- Jim Leach, IA-01 (1977–2007)
- Norman F. Lent, NY-05 (1971–1973), NY-04 (1973–1993)
- Jim Ross Lightfoot, IA-05 (1985–1993), IA-03 (1993–1997)
- Tom Lewis, FL-12 (1983–1995)
- Tom Loeffler, TX-21 (1979–1987)
- Manuel Lujan Jr., NM-01 (1969–1989)
- Ron Marlenee, MT-02 (1977–1993)
- David O'Brien Martin, NY-30 (1981–1983), NY-26 (1983–1993)
- Lynn M. Martin, IL-16 (1981–1991)
- Bill McCollum, FL-05 (1981–2001)
- Joseph M. McDade, PA-10 (1963–1999)
- Raymond J. McGrath, NY-05 (1981–1993)
- Stewart McKinney, CT-04 (1971–1987) (Died before endorsement was made public)
- Clarence E. Miller, OH-21 (1967–1993)
- Guy Molinari, NY-17 (1981–1983), NY-14 (1983–1989)
- Sid Morrison, WA-04 (1981–1993)
- Mike Oxley, OH-04 (1981–2007)
- Tom Petri, WI-06 (1979–2015)
- Carl Pursell, MI-02 (1977–1993)
- Arthur Ravenel Jr., SC-01 (1987–1995)
- Ralph Regula, OH-16 (1973–2009)
- Tom Ridge, PA-21 (1983–1995)
- Matthew J. Rinaldo, NJ-12 (1973–1983), NJ-07 (1983–1993)
- Hal Rogers, KY-05 (1981–present)
- Marge Roukema, NJ-07 (1981–1983), NJ-05 (1983–2003) (previously endorsed Dole)
- John G. Rowland, CT-05 (1985–1991)
- Pat Saiki, HI-01 (1987–1991) (previously endorsed Dole)
- Jim Saxton, NJ-13 (1984–1993), NJ-03 (1993–2009)
- Bill Schuette, MI-10 (1985–1991)
- Clay Shaw, FL-12 (1981–1983), FL-15 (1983–1993), FL-22 (1993–2007)
- Jim Sensenbrenner, WI-09 (1979–2003), WI-05 (2003–2021)
- Chris Shays, CT-04 (1987–2009)
- Bud Shuster, PA-09 (1973–2001)
- Joe Skeen, NM-02 (1981–2003)
- Chris Smith, NJ-04 (1981–present) (previously endorsed Kemp)
- Lamar Smith, TX-21 (1987–2019)
- Gerald Solomon, NY-29 (1979–1983), NY-24 (1983–1993), NY-22 (1993–1999)
- Olympia Snowe, ME-2 (1979–1995)
- Don Sundquist, TN-07 (1983–1995)
- Mac Sweeney, TX-14 (1985–1989)
- Tom Tauke, IA-02 (1979–1991)
- Gene Taylor, MS-05 (1989–2003), MS-05 (2003–2011)
- Jimmy Quillen, TN-01 (1963–1997)
- Curt Weldon, PA-07 (1987–2007)
- Chalmers Wylie, OH-15 (1967–1993)
- Bill Young, FL-08 (1971–1973), FL-06 (1973–1983), FL-08 (1983–1993), FL-10 (1993–2013), FL-13 (2013)

==== Former ====
- T. Cooper Evans, IA-03 (1981–1987)
- Thomas F. Hartnett, SC-01 (1981–1987)
- Gene Snyder, KY-03 (1963–1965), KY-04 (1967–1987)
- Edward Lunn Young, SC-06 (1976–1975)

== Newspapers, magazines, and other news media ==
- The Advocate
- Albany Democrat-Herald
- The Alliance Review
- Atlantic News-Telegraph
- The Ardmoreite
- The Arizona Republic
- Amarillo Globe-News
- Artesia Daily Press
- Arkansas Democrat-Gazette
- The Augusta Chronicle
- Baker City Herald
- Bartlesville Examiner-Enterprise
- Bastrop Daily Enterprise
- The Beacon-News
- The Beaumont Enterprise
- Belvidere Daily Republican
- Belleville News-Democrat
- Boca Raton News
- Boston Herald
- The Brunswick News
- The Caledonian-Record
- Capital Journal
- Carroll County Times
- Casa Grande Dispatch
- Charleston Gazette-Mail
- Chicago Sun-Times
- Chicago Tribune
- Chico Enterprise-Record
- The Chronicle
- The Cincinnati Enquirer
- The Cincinnati Post
- Citrus County Chronicle
- The Clarion-Ledger
- Claremore Daily Progress
- The Columbus Dispatch
- The Commercial Appeal
- The Cullman Times
- Daily American
- Daily Breeze
- Daily Commercial
- Daily Herald
- The Daily Item
- Daily Mountain Eagle
- Daily News-Record
- Daily Review Atlas
- The Daily Sentinel
- Daily Star
- The Daily Times
- The Dallas Morning News
- Dallas Times Herald
- Danville Register & Bee
- Denton Record-Chronicle
- The Denver Post
- The Detroit News
- The Dispatch
- Dothan Eagle
- The Duncan Banner
- Eagle Times
- Emporia Gazette
- The Examiner
- Farmington Daily Times
- The Florida Times-Union
- Florida Today
- Fort Morgan Times
- Foster's Daily Democrat
- The Forum of Fargo-Moorhead
- Gainesville Daily Register
- The Gainesville Times
- Gillette News-Record
- Glendale News-Press
- Greensburg Daily News
- The Grand Island Independent
- Grants Pass Daily Courier
- Hamilton JournalNews
- Hannibal Courier-Post
- The Herald-Times
- Hillsdale Daily News
- Hollywood Sun-Tattler
- Houston Chronicle
- Houston Post
- Imperial Valley Press
- The Indianapolis Star
- The Intelligencer
- The Joplin Globe
- The Journal-Register
- The Journal Standard
- Juneau Empire
- The Kenton Times
- Ketchikan Daily News
- Kerrville Daily Times
- Kirksville Daily Express
- Knoxville News Sentinel
- Kokomo Tribune
- The Ledger
- Lodi News-Sentinel
- Lompoc Record
- Lubbock Avalanche-Journal
- Madera Tribune
- Madison Courier
- Malden Evening News
- Marietta Daily Journal
- McKinney Courier-Gazette
- The Meridian Star
- Miami Herald
- Midland Reporter-Telegram
- Mineral Wells Index
- The Morning Sun
- The Mount Airy News
- National Review
- Naples Daily News
- News Chief
- The News Courier
- New Hampshire Union Leader
- The News-Herald
- The News Leader
- The News-Press
- The News Sun
- The Newton Kansan
- New York City Tribune
- New York Daily News
- New York Post
- Norfolk Daily News
- The Observer
- Ocala StarBanner
- The Oklahoman
- Omaha World-Herald
- Orlando Sentinel
- Oshkosh Northwestern
- Pensacola News Journal
- Phoenix Gazette
- The Pittsburgh Press
- Plainview Herald
- Pomona Progress Bulletin
- The Post-Journal
- Prescott Courier
- Press-Register
- The Pueblo Chieftain
- Record Herald
- Redding Record Searchlight
- Red Wing Republican Eagle
- The Reporter
- The Repository
- Rocky Mountain News
- Roswell Daily Record
- The Sacramento Union
- The Salem News
- The San Diego Union-Tribune
- San Mateo County Times
- San Francisco Examiner
- San Gabriel Valley Tribune
- Santa Maria Times
- Sarasota Herald-Tribune
- San Pedro News-Pilot
- Savannah Morning News
- Seattle Post-Intelligencer
- Sedalia Democrat
- Selma Times-Journal
- Shoshone News Press
- Sioux City Journal
- The Spectrum
- Spokane Daily Chronicle
- The Spokesman-Review
- Sapulpa Herald
- The St. Augustine Record
- The Star
- The Sun
- Sun Sentinel
- The Tampa Tribune
- Times-News
- The Times-Reporter
- The Times
- Titusville Herald
- The Topeka Capital-Journal
- Tulsa Tribune
- Tulsa World
- Tyler Morning Telegraph
- The Union Democrat
- The Victoria Advocate
- Vincennes Sun-Commercial
- Warrensburg Star-Journal
- Waterbury American
- Waterbury Republican
- The Westerly Sun
- The World
- York Daily Record

== State, territorial, and tribal executive officials ==
=== Current governors ===
- Norman H. Bangerter, 13th Governor of Utah (1985–1993)
- Henry Bellmon, 18th and 23rd Governor of Oklahoma (1963–1967; 1987–1991)
- Terry Branstad, 39th and 42nd Governor of Iowa (1983–1999; 2011–2017)
- Garrey Carruthers, 27th Governor of New Mexico (1987–1991)
- Mike Castle, 69th Governor of Delaware (1985–1992)
- Bill Clements, 42nd and 44th Governor of Texas (1979–1983; 1987–1991)
- Carroll A. Campbell Jr., 112th Governor of South Carolina (1987–1995)
- George Deukmejian, 35th Governor of California (1983–1991)
- Edward D. DiPrete, 70th Governor of Rhode Island (1985–1991)
- Thomas Kean, 48th Governor of New Jersey (1982–1990)
- James G. Martin, 70th Governor of North Carolina (1985–1993)
- Bob Martinez, 40th Governor of Florida (1987–1991)
- John R. McKernan Jr., 71st Governor of Maine (1987–1995)
- Evan Mecham, 17th Governor of Arizona (1987–1988)
- Arch A. Moore Jr., 28th and 30th Governor of West Virginia (1969–1977; 1985–1989)
- Robert D. Orr, 45th Governor of Indiana (1981–1989)
- John H. Sununu, 75th Governor of New Hampshire (1983–1989)
- James R. Thompson, 37th Governor of Illinois (1977–1991)
- Tommy Thompson, 42nd Governor of Wisconsin (1987–2001)

=== Former governors ===
- Edward J. King, 66th Governor of Massachusetts (1979–1983)
- Louie Nunn, 52nd Governor of Kentucky (1967–1971)
- Jim Rhodes, 61st and 63rd Governor of Ohio (1963–1971; 1975–1983)
- Robert D. Ray, 38th Governor of Iowa (1969–1983)
- Francis Sargent, 64th Governor of Massachusetts (1969–1975)
- Dick Thornburgh, 41st Governor of Pennsylvania (1979–1987)

=== Other ===
- Jane Burgio, Secretary of State of New Jersey (1982–1990)
- Jim Edgar, 35th Secretary of State of Illinois (1981–1991)
- Hazel Gluck, New Jersey Commissioner of Transportation (1986–1989)
- Kent Hance, Railroad Commission of Texas (1987–1991)
- Richard D. Johnson, 30th Iowa Auditor of State (1979–2003)
- Tony Meeker, Oregon State Treasurer (1987–1993)
- George Ryan, 42nd Lieutenant Governor of Illinois (1983–1991)

=== Tribal executives ===
- James Allen, Principal chief of the Seneca–Cayuga Nation
- Bill Fallis, Principal chief of the Modoc Nation
- Harry Glimore, chairman of the Quapaw tribe
- Elmer Manatowa, Principal chief of the Sac and Fox Nation
- Bill Mehojah, chairman of the Kaw tribe
- Cynthia Stoner, chairman of the Ponca tribe
- Edwin Tanyan, Principal chief of the Seminole Nation of Oklahoma

== State legislators ==
=== Arizona House of Representatives ===
- John H. Haugh, member (1953–1967; 1969–1971) and Speaker (1969–1971)

=== Florida House of Representatives ===
- Chester Clem, FL-48 (1972–1976)

=== Florida Senate ===
- William G. Myers, FL-27 (1982–2000)

=== Georgia State Senate ===
- Paul Coverdell, GA-40 (1973–1989)

=== Illinois Senate ===
- Ralph A. Dunn, (1985–1995)

=== Iowa House of Representatives ===
- Brent Siegrist, IA-99 (1985–1993), IA-84 (1993–2003), IA-19 (2021–present)

=== Kentucky House of Representatives ===
- Mae Hoover

=== Kentucky Senate ===
- David L. Williams, KY-16 (1987–2012)

=== Maine Senate ===
- Peter Whitmore

=== Massachusetts Senate ===
- Paul Cellucci, Middlesex and Worcester (1985–1991)

=== New York State Assembly ===
- Peter Sullivan

=== New York State Senate ===
- Eugene Levy, NY-38 (1985–1990)

=== Ohio House of Representatives ===
- Sam Bateman, OH-71 (1985–2000)
- Michael A. Fox, OH-59 (1975–1997)
- Corwin M. Nixon, OH-84 (1967–1992)
- Bob Taft, OH-65 (1977–1981)
- Dale N. Van Vyven, OH-32 (1978–2000)

=== Ohio Senate ===
- Stan Aronoff, OH-08 (1967–1996)
- Grace L. Drake, OH-22 (1984–2000)
- Dave Hobson, OH-10 (1982–1991)
- Barry Levey, OH-04 (1987–1995)
- Bob Ney, OH-20 (1984–1995)
- Paul Pfeifer, OH-26 (1977–1992)
- Cooper Snyder, OH-14 (1979–1996)
- Eugene J. Watts, OH-16 (1985–2000)

=== Pennsylvania House of Representatives ===
- Matthew J. Ryan, Delaware County (1963–1968), PA-168 (1969–2003) and 81st Speaker (1981–1983; 1995–2003)

=== Pennsylvania State Senate ===
- Robert Jubelirer, PA-30 (1975–2006) and President pro tempore (1981–1984; 1992–1994)

=== South Carolina House of Representatives ===
- Woody Aydlette, SC-115 (1981–1987)
- Moffatt Burriss, SC-78 (1977–1992)
- John Hay Burriss, SC-85 (1985–1987)
- Paul Derrick, SC-69 (1983–1990)
- Mike Fair, SC-19 (1984–1994)
- Gene Foxworth, SC-110 (1985–1987)
- Joyce Hearn, SC-76 (1975–1990)
- Robert Kohn, SC-113 (1978–1998)
- David H. Wilkins, SC-24 (1980–2005)

=== South Carolina Senate ===
- Sam Applegate, SC-43 (1985–1987)
- John Courson, SC-20 (1985–2018)
- Warren Giese, SC-22 (1985–2003)
- Rick Lee, SC-37 (1985–1989)
- John Russell, SC-32 (1987–1999)
- Joe Wilson, SC-23 (1985–2001)

=== Texas House of Representatives ===
- M.A. Taylor, TX-55 (1985–1993)
- Mike Toomey, TX-135 (1983–1988)

=== Wyoming Senate ===
- Donald Cundall
- Daniel Sullivan
- James Twiford

== Municipal and local officials ==
Mayors

- Frank Esposito, Mayor of Norwalk, Connecticut (1987–2001)
- Charles Evers, mayor of Fayette, Mississippi (1969–1981; 1985–1989)
- Emory Folmar, 54th Mayor of Montgomery, Alabama (1977–1999) and chair of the Alabama Republican Party
- Margaret Hance, 52nd Mayor of Phoenix, Arizona (1976–1984)
- William H. Hudnut III, 45th Mayor of Indianapolis (1976–1992)
- George Israel, mayor of Macon, Georgia (1979–1987)
- Frank Rizzo, former Mayor of Philadelphia (1972–1980)
- Xavier Suarez, 35th and 39th Mayor of Miami (1985–1993; 1997–1998)
- José Dapena Thompson, 130th Mayor of Ponce, Puerto Rico (1984–1988)

Others

- Stephen Goldsmith, prosecutor of Marion County, Indiana (1979–1991)
- James Metts, Lexington County Sheriff (1972–2015)
- James E. O'Grady, Cook County Sheriff (1986–1990)
- Thomas F. Riley, member of the Orange County Board of Supervisors (1974–1994)
- Susan Bitter Smith, member of the Scottsdale, Arizona city council (1988–1992)
- Roger Stanton, member of the Orange County Board of Supervisors (1974–1994)

== Party officials ==
=== National ===
- Nelda Barton, member of the Republican National Committee from Kentucky
- Elsie Hillman, member of the Republican National Committee from Pennsylvania (1975–1996)
- Mary Louise Smith, chair of the Republican National Committee (1974–1977)

=== Statewide ===
- Earl M. Baker, chair of the Pennsylvania Republican Party (1989–1990)
- George Clark, chair of the New York Republican State Committee (1981–1985)
- Anthony J. Colavita, chair of the New York Republican State Committee (1985–1989)
- Fred Cooper, chair of the Georgia Republican Party(1981–1985)
- Rolf Craft, chair of the Republican Party of Iowa
- Gordon Durnil, chair of the Indiana Republican Party (1981–1989)
- George G. Graham, chair of the South Carolina Republican Party (1980–1986)
- Pauline R. Kezer, vice-chair of the Connecticut Republican Party
- Sally J. Novetzke, chair of the Republican Party of Iowa
- Charles Poliner, chair of the Connecticut Republican Party
- Daniel I. Ross Jr., chair of the South Carolina Republican Party (1977–1979)
- Bennett Webster, chair of the Republican Party of Iowa

=== County ===
- Michael Blake, chair of the Nassau County Republican Party
- Joseph Mondello, chair of the Nassau County Republican Committee (1984–2018)

== International officials ==
- Muammar Gaddafi, Brotherly Leader and Guide of the Revolution (1979–2011)
- Deng Xiaoping, Chairman of the Central Advisory Commission (1982–1987) (Chinese Communist Party)

== Organizations ==
- California Republican Assembly
- National Right to Life Committee
- Veterans of Foreign Wars PAC

== Labor unions ==
- Boston Police Patrolmen's Association
- California Correctional Peace Officers Association
- Fraternal Order of Police
- International Brotherhood of Teamsters
- Marine Engineers' Beneficial Association
- Police Benevolent Association of the City of New York

== Notable individuals ==
- Julius Berman, American attorney and rabbi (Democrat)
- Jerry Falwell, president of Liberty University
- Paul X. Kelley, retired general
- Rich Little, comedian
- Pat Robertson, minister, 1988 Republican presidential candidate
- Joe Rogers Jr., president of Waffle House
- Phyllis Schlafly, activist
- Ray Scott, president of the Bass Anglers Sportsman Society
- Donald Trump, American Businessman
- David K. Wilson, businessman and Republican donor
- Chuck Yeager, United States Air Force officer

Actors and filmmakers

- Helen Hayes, actress
- Charlton Heston, actor
- Cheryl Ladd, actress
- Tom Selleck, actor
- Robert Stack, actor
- Shirley Temple, actor, Chief of Protocol of the United States (1976–1977) and United States Ambassador to Ghana (1974–1976)
- Jerry Weintraub, producer

Athletes

- Muhammad Ali, boxer
- Pete Dawkins, football player and Republican senatorial candidate
- Walt Frazier, basketball player
- Joe Paterno, coach
- Nolan Ryan, baseball pitcher
- Ted Williams, baseball player

Music

- Loretta Lynn, country singer
- Mickey Gilley, singer
- Lionel Hampton, jazz vibraphonist

== Works cited ==
=== Books ===
- Moreland, Laurence; Steed, Robert; Baker, Tod, eds. (1991). The 1988 Presidential Election in the South: Continuity Amidst Change in Southern Party Politics. Praeger Publishers. ISBN 0275931455.

=== Newspapers ===
- "2 area state legislators to back Bush in '88". The Daily Item. May 19, 1987. p. 16 – via Newspapers.com.
- "22 Florida newspapers endorse Bush". The News-Press. November 7, 1988. p. 13A – via Newspapers.com.
- "3 West Texans Endorse Bush". The Victoria Advocate. February 17, 1988. p. 4C – via Newspapers.com.
- "Boston Paper Switches Endorsement". The Daily Progress. October 26, 1988. p. A3 – via Newspapers.com.
- "Branstad endorses Bush for nomination". Iowa City Press-Citizen. April 5, 1988. p. 4A – via Newspapers.com.
- "Burton endorses Bush for nomination". Indianapolis News. April 7, 1988. p. D9 – via Newspapers.com.
- "Bush". Fort Worth Star-Telegram. December 29, 1987. p. 12 – via Newspapers.com.
- "Bush". The Lewiston Daily Sun. February 3, 1988. p. 8 – via Newspapers.com.
- "Bush backers include Clinger". Indiana Gazette. April 30, 1987. p. 7 – via Newspapers.com.
- "Bush Campaign Jets Through Albuquerque". Albuquerque Journal. May 13, 1988. p. A9 – via Newspapers.com.
- "Campaign: GOP Presidential Hopefuls Head West". Los Angeles Times. September 24, 1987. p. 15 – via Newspapers.com.
- "Campbell cites 'experience' of George Bush". Columbia Record. November 26, 1987. p. 11C – via Newspapers.com.
- "Chico Enterprise-Record Endorsements". Chico Enterprise-Record. November 7, 1988. p. 4B – via Newspapers.com.
- "Congressmen see strong Bush". The Reporter. April 4, 1988. p. 9 – via Newspapers.com.
- "Connecticut GOP Chief Endorses Bush". Omaha World-Herald. March 24, 1988. p. 47 – via Newspapers.com.
- "Convention '88: The Republicans". The Arizona Republic. August 14, 1988. p. C8 – via Newspapers.com.
- "Cooksey, Cross to head local George Bush campaign". Clinton County News. February 4, 1988. p. 10 – via Newspapers.com.
- "Cuban Bass?". The Des Moines Register. February 18, 1988. p. 2S – via Newspapers.com.
- "Dick Armey". Times Record News. April 8, 1988. p. 7D – via Newspapers.com.
- "Dole/ Quits race, returns to Senate role". Santa Cruz Sentinel. March 30, 1988. p. A12 – via Newspapers.com.
- "Dukakis turning up heat". The News Herald. October 24, 1988. p. 9 – via Newspapers.com.
- "Durnil neutral as governor taps Bush". Indianapolis News. January 2, 1988. p. C6 – via Newspapers.com.
- "Edgar Ready to Back Bush for President". Chicago Tribune. January 4, 1988. Archived from the original on January 17, 2025.
- "Elliot Richardson endorses Bush". Kearney Hub. March 4, 1988. p. 8 – via Newspapers.com.
- "Endorsements". Miami Herald. March 5, 1988. p. 20A – via Newspapers.com.
- "Endorsements carry risk, reward". Hartford Courant. March 13, 1988. p. B11 – via Newspapers.com.
- "Etc". Miami Herald. February 17, 1988. p. 9A – via Newspapers.com.
- "Evans endorses Bush candidacy". The Daily News. March 3, 1988. p. A3 – via Newspapers.com.
- "Ex-Dole campaigner jumps on Bush wagon". Florida Today. April 14, 1988. p. 9B – via Newspapers.com.
- "Former state GOP chairman endorses Bush over ally Kemp". The Post-Star. November 4, 1987. p. D4 – via Newspapers.com.
- "Garn throws his support behind Bush campaign". Daily Herald. March 16, 1988. p. 22 – via Newspapers.com.
- "Georgia". The Tampa Tribune. August 30, 1987. p. 8A – via Newspapers.com.
- "GOP". Springfield News-Leader. February 7, 1987. p. 2A – via Newspapers.com.
- "Gramm says Dukakis will 'wimp America'". The Daily Advertiser. August 18, 1988. p. 20 – via Newspapers.com.
- "Haig's Dukakis cracks disavowed". The Modesto Bee. August 16, 1988. p. A3 – via Newspapers.com.
- "Heinz casts lot with Bush in race for presidency". The Evening News. March 7, 1988. p. B3 – via Newspapers.com.
- "Hollywood stars coming out for favorite candidates". Ventura County Star. May 15, 1988. p. B6 – via Newspapers.com.
- "It's Early, But Taft Already Looking Toward 1990 Contest For Governor". Times Recorder. October 7, 1987. p. 5A – via Newspapers.com.
- "Kemp's for Bush; delegates, too?". Detroit Free Press. March 29, 1988. p. 3A – via Newspapers.com.
- "Lawmakers tell why they back Bush". Lexington Herald-Leader. November 21, 1987. p. B2 – via Newspapers.com.
- "Martin Speaks At City Rally". Winston-Salem Journal. October 22, 1988. p. 32 – via Newspapers.com.
- "M.A. Taylor Heads Regional Bush Drive". The Waco Citizen. January 15, 1988. p. 6 – via Newspapers.com.
- "Many Southerners In Congress Endorse Candidate". The Daily Times. February 14, 1988. p. A10 – via Newspapers.com.
- "McKernan backs Bush". Sun Journal. May 8, 1987. p. 1A – via Newspapers.com.
- "Mecham downplays GOP fight". Arizona Daily Sun. May 11, 1988. p. 3 – via Newspapers.com.
- "Meeker endorses Bush". The Oregonian. March 25, 1988. p. D3 – via Newspapers.com.
- "Miami's Mayor Suarez backs Bush". Tampa Bay Times. January 10, 1988. p. 2B – via Newspapers.com.
- "New Jersey's governor endorses George Bush". Orlando Sentinel. March 22, 1987. p. A4 – via Newspapers.com.
- "Paparazzi Politics". New York Daily News. March 6, 1988. p. 5A – via Newspapers.com.
- "Politics". Tyler Morning Telegraph. March 29, 1988. p. 6 – via Newspapers.com.
- "Primary". Winston-Salem Journal. March 6, 1988. p. C6 – via Newspapers.com.
- "Republicans divided on presidential race". Bristol Herald Courier. October 19, 1987. p. 4A – via Newspapers.com.
- "Rhodes endorses George Bush". Urbana Daily Citizen. November 27, 1987. p. A11 – via Newspapers.com.
- "Roth Endorses George Bush". The Daily Times. March 16, 1988. p. 6 – via Newspapers.com.
- "Sargent endorses Bush". North Adams Transcript. January 9, 1988. p. 1 – via Newspapers.com.
- "Saxton Backs Bush". The Press of Atlantic City. March 23, 1988. p. 36 – via Newspapers.com.
- "Sen. Dunn Endorses Bush For Republican Nomination". Waterloo Republic-Times. September 23, 1987. p. 11 – via Newspapers.com.
- "Siegrist backs Bush". The Daily Nonpareil. February 5, 1988. p. 2A – via Newspapers.com.
- "State GOP senators endorse George Bush". Casper Star-Tribune. April 3, 1988. p. A3 – via Newspapers.com.
- "State, local officials endorse candidates". The Item. February 8, 1988. p. 5A – via Newspapers.com.
- "State Senator Levey Endorses George Bush". The Early Bird. January 4, 1988. p. 2 – via Newspapers.com.
- "Support pleasing to Bush". Fort Worth Star-Telegram. July 1, 1987. p. 6 – via Newspapers.com.
- "Symms in Bush camp". Spokane Chronicle. March 30, 1988. p. A8 – via Newspapers.com.
- "Texas congressmen either endorse Gephardt, Bush or stay undecided". The Bryan-College Station Eagle. September 26, 1987. p. 3A – via Newspapers.com.
- "Text". The Times. September 29, 1988. p. 9 – via Newspapers.com.
- "These are the presidential candidates favored by members of Congress from Ohio". Akron Beacon Journal. February 12, 1988. p. A12. Archived from the original on July 23, 2024 – via Newspapers.com.
- "Thornburg For Bush". Pittsburgh Post-Gazette. April 18, 1988. p. 3 – via Newspapers.com.
- "Who's Going". The Palm Beach Post. August 14, 1988. p. 11A – via Newspapers.com.
- Balzar, John (August 4, 1988). "Bush to Keep Running Mate Secret to Create Interest". Los Angeles Times. p. 19 – via Newspapers.com.
- Barker, Jeff (March 16, 1988). "Endorsements carry risk, reward". Centre Daily Times. p. A12 – via Newspapers.com.
- Bass, Frank (February 10, 1988). "Folmar endorses Bush's candidacy for president". Alabama Journal. p. 2 – via Newspapers.com.
- Benedetto, Richard (August 16, 1988). "Talk of town is whom Bush will choose". USA Today. p. 3 – via Newspapers.com.
- Borden, Robert (December 22, 1987). "Joe Barton ready for re-election campaign". The Bryan-College Station Eagle. p. 2A – via Newspapers.com.
- Borreca, Richard (August 3, 1988). "Saiki picked for role at GOP meet". Honolulu Star-Advertiser. p. A7 – via Newspapers.com.
- Church, Foster; Hayakawa, Alan (April 4, 1988). "Hatfield, Packwood back Bush candidacy". The Oregonian. p. A7 – via Newspapers.com.
- Clements, Michael (January 24, 1987). "Endorsements of Bush over Kemp have "powerful" effect, Zartman says". Democrat and Chronicle. p. 1B – via Newspapers.com.
- Daubenmier, Judy (November 23, 1987). "Candidates hoping endorsements will tip balance in Iowa". The Gazette. p. 4A – via Newspapers.com.
- Doris, Tony (October 28, 1987). "Tower cites gains since Iran scandal". Tampa Bay Times. p. 3B – via Newspapers.com.
- Dornan, Robert (November 6, 1987). "Stop Beating Around the Bush". The New York Times. Archived from the original on November 8, 2022.
- Eysen, Alan (December 12, 1987). "Mondello Endorses George Bush". Newsday. p. 4 – via Newspapers.com.
- Feather, Bill (November 24, 1987). "Thompson endorses Bush for president". The Sheboygan Press. p. 6 – via Newspapers.com.
- Hale, John (July 17, 1987). "Bush campaigns in Maine". Bangor Daily News. p. 9 – via Newspapers.com.
- Hardy, Thomas (August 24, 1987). "GOP hopefuls display big guns". Chicago Tribune. p. 3 – via Newspapers.com.
- Henry, John (November 24, 1987). "Bush backs agreement on deficit". Austin American-Statesman. p. A3 – via Newspapers.com.
- Huntley, Dan (March 1, 1988). "Bush, In Charleston, Promotes Strong Defense". The Charlotte Observer. p. 4A – via Newspapers.com.
- Johnson, Bob (November 6, 1987). "Bunning to lead Athletes for Bush group". Courier Journal. p. B2 – via Newspapers.com.
- Keidan, Bruce (August 16, 1988). "Paterno speech no matter for criticism". Pittsburgh Post-Gazette. p. 25 – via Newspapers.com.
- Klein, Gil (September 23, 1988). "Boston Police Union Endorses George Bush". Winston-Salem Journal. p. 1 – via Newspapers.com.
- Lynn, Frank (February 1, 1987). "Kemp's Aides Conceding 'Establishment' to Bush". The New York Times. Archived from the original on November 8, 2017.
- Machacek, Jay (January 22, 1987). "Most N.Y. congressmen back Bush, not state's Kemp". Tarrytown Daily News. p. D4 – via Newspapers.com.
- Magner, Mike; Teare, Jacqueline (July 1, 1987). "Vander Jagt, Upton neutral on Bush". Muskegon Chronicle. p. 4B – via Newspapers.com.
- Marx, Jeffrey (November 21, 1987). "Lawmakers tell why they back Bush". Lexington Herald-Leader. p. B1 – via Newspapers.com.
- McCartney, James (September 13, 1988). "Carter foreign policy adviser throws his support to Bush". The Philadelphia Inquirer. p. 1A – via Newspapers.com.
- McCombs, Phil (July 2, 1988). "Queen Of The American Right". Newsday. p. 2-2 – via Newspapers.com.
- Miller, Jay (August 12, 1987). "Inside the Capitol". Deming Headlight. p. 2 – via Newspapers.com.
- O'Neill, James (December 20, 1987). "Local GOP backs Bush for president". Poughkeepsie Journal. p. 1B – via Newspapers.com.
- Philips, Frank (November 3, 1987). "Ex-Gov. King backs Bush, hits Dukakis on 'miracle'". The Boston Globe. p. 6 – via Newspapers.com.
- Richardson, Doug (March 17, 1988). "Governor joins the Bush bandwagon". Muncie Evening Press. p. 6 – via Newspapers.com.
- Roberts, Stevens (May 12, 1988). "Reagan Endorses Bush as Successor". The New York Times.
- Robertson, John (November 25, 1987). "Carruthers Accepts Regional Position In Bush Campaign". Albuquerque Journal. p. A2 – via Newspapers.com.
- Shuit, Douglas (April 21, 1988). "Governor Endorses Bush, Incumbent GOP Lawmakers". Los Angeles Times. p. 3 – via Newspapers.com.
- Shurr, Maureen (March 2, 1988). "Endorse". The State. p. 6C – via Newspapers.com.
- Stanley, William (March 24, 1988). "State Republican leaders endorse Bush". Lexington Herald-Leader. p. A12 – via Newspapers.com.
- Tuttle, Barbara (April 6, 1988). "Morrison backs Bush and Baker". Cashmere Valley Record. p. 1 – via Newspapers.com.
- Wald, David (April 15, 1988). "Governor will head unopposed Bush slate". The Star-Ledger. p. 17 – via Newspapers.com.
- Weinraub, Bernard (May 18, 1987). "Statehood Issue Trips Bush Efforts". The New York Times.
- Willis, Doug (March 21, 1988). "Conservative state GOP group endorses Bush". Santa Cruz Sentinel. p. A4 – via Newspapers.com.
- White, Robert (December 23, 1987). "Bush, Dole rhubarb". The Cincinnati Post. p. 3B – via Newspapers.com.
- Yanez, Luisa (October 6, 1988). "Ford endorses Bush, Quayle". Sun Sentinel. p. 9A – via Newspapers.com.
- Yepsen, David (September 21, 1988). "Bush better than Reagan, Lightfoot says". The Des Moines Register. p. 3M – via Newspapers.com.
