= Fryman =

Surname list

Fryman is the surname of the following people

- Pamela Fryman (born 1959), American sitcom director and producer
- Richard Fryman (1935–2021), American politician in Kentucky
- Travis Fryman (born 1969), American baseball player
- Woodie Fryman (1940–2011), American baseball pitcher

== See also ==
- Meyer Fryman House, US national historic place
