= The Mexican =

2001 film by Gore Verbinski

- Theatrical release poster
- Directed by: Gore Verbinski
- Written by: J. H. Wyman
- Produced by: Lawrence Bender; John Baldecchi
- Starring: Julia Roberts; Brad Pitt; James Gandolfini
- Cinematography: Dariusz Wolski
- Edited by: Craig Wood
- Music by: Alan Silvestri
- Production company: Newmarket
- Distributed by: DreamWorks Pictures
- Release date: March 2, 2001; (United States)
- Running time: 123 minutes
- Country: United States
- Language: English
- Budget: $40–57 million
- Box office: $147.8 million

The Mexican is a 2001 American romantic crime comedy film directed by Gore Verbinski. The film stars Julia Roberts and Brad Pitt, with James Gandolfini, Bob Balaban, J. K. Simmons, David Krumholtz and Gene Hackman in supporting roles.

It tells the story of a small-time criminal (Pitt) who is sent on a mission to retrieve an antique pistol in Mexico, while his girlfriend (Roberts), frustrated with their troubled relationship, finds herself entangled in a series of unexpected events.

The Mexican was released in the United States on March 2, 2001, to mixed reviews from critics, and grossed $147.8 million.

== Plot ==
In Los Angeles, a traffic light changes to red, and off-screen sounds of an automobile collision are heard.

Five years later, Jerry Welbach has been working off a debt to imprisoned mob boss Arnold Margolese. After Jerry fouls up what was supposed to be his final errand, Margolese's second-in-command, Bernie Nayman, sends Jerry on a new, final errand: retrieving an antique pistol in Mexico for Margolese from a man named Beck. This additional job proves to be the last straw for Jerry's girlfriend, Sam, who leaves him to move to Las Vegas.

In Mexico, Jerry finds the pistol with Beck, who explains the history of the legendary gun, known as "the Mexican". When Beck is killed by a stray bullet from celebratory gunfire, Jerry calls his colleague Ted and learns that Beck was Margolese's grandson. Just then, Jerry's car is stolen, with Beck's body and the pistol inside. Jerry recovers the car and the gun, shooting one of the thieves in the foot and burying the body, but cuts off, and keep, a toe as a keepsake.

While Sam is traveling to Las Vegas, a well-dressed hitman attempts to abduct her but is shot by another hitman who captures her instead. The second hitman introduces himself as Leroy and explains that he was hired to hold Sam hostage to ensure Jerry delivers the pistol.

Sam explains to Leroy that Jerry became indebted to Margolese five years earlier after crashing into Margolese's car while running a red light. At the accident site, the police discovered someone tied up in Margolese's trunk whom he intended to kill. Margolese was sent to prison for five years, and Jerry was forced to run errands for Margolese during that time. Bonding with Leroy, Sam correctly deduces that he is gay and encourages him to pick up Frank, a traveling postal worker. The three of them reach Las Vegas, and Leroy and Frank spend the night together.

In Mexico, Jerry is briefly arrested after a police officer notices Beck's blood in his car. Confiscating the pistol, the officer elaborates on its cursed history and takes it to a pawn shop. Ted arrives and reveals that the infamous Leroy has been sent after Sam. Jerry overhears a call with Nayman ordering Ted to kill him. They recover the pistol from the pawn shop, but Jerry confronts Ted and leaves with the gun. Realizing he grabbed Ted's passport instead of his own, he returns to find Ted has already fled.

In Las Vegas, the well-dressed hitman murders the innocent Frank and returns for Sam but is killed by a vengeful Leroy. Sam and Leroy fly to Mexico to meet Jerry, who crashes the car in an argument with Sam. Leroy finds the pistol and prepares to kill Jerry, but Jerry kills him first. He explains to a distraught Sam that Leroy was an imposter—his driver's license reveals he is actually Winston Baldry—and that Jerry once met the real Leroy, the well-dressed black hitman. Jerry realizes that Margolese hired the real Leroy, but Nayman sent Baldry to intercept Sam and the pistol, allowing him to sell it himself and frame Jerry.

Sam and Jerry prepare to go their separate ways, but Sam remembers Baldry's advice to never give up when you truly love someone and reconciles with Jerry. Soon afterward, Jerry is kidnapped by the thieves who stole his car. He is brought to Margolese, newly released from prison, who explains the true story of the pistol: it was crafted by a gunsmith for his daughter's marriage to a nobleman's cruel son, but the daughter and the gunsmith's assistant were truly in love. When the gun refused to fire for the nobleman's son, he killed the assistant, leading the daughter to take her own life with the pistol.

It is revealed that Margolese's cellmate was the gunsmith's great-grandson; he was killed protecting Margolese, who swore to return the pistol to his cellmate's father. Jerry agrees to give him the pistol, but Nayman kidnaps Sam. A Mexican standoff ensues until Sam kills Nayman with the pistol. The shot dislodges a ring from the gun barrel, which Jerry uses to propose to Sam. The Mexican pistol is restored to the gunsmith's family, as Jerry and Sam drive off together.

== Cast ==
- Brad Pitt as Jerry Welbach
- Julia Roberts as Samantha "Sam" Barzel
- James Gandolfini as Winston Baldry
- Bob Balaban as Bernie Nayman
- J. K. Simmons as Ted Slocum
- David Krumholtz as Beck
- Richard Coca as Car Thief
- Michael Cerveris as Frank
- Sherman Augustus as Leroy/Well Dressed Black Man
- Cástulo Guerra as Joe, The Pawn Shop Owner
- Gene Hackman as Arnold Margolese
- Ernesto Gómez Cruz as Tropillo

== Production ==
=== Pre-production ===
The script was originally meant for an independent film without major movie stars. However, Julia Roberts and Brad Pitt had for some time been looking for a project to do together, and after Roberts introduced the script to Pitt, they both agreed to star in it. Roberts also suggested casting James Gandolfini, in what went on to be regarded as one of his greatest roles.

Kevin Reynolds and David Fincher were both considered to direct the film. However, Reynolds turned it down because the cast was not confirmed, while Fincher was unavailable due to his prior commitments with the release of Fight Club (1999). Additionally, Ben Stiller and Meg Ryan had also expressed interest in playing the lead roles in the film.

=== Filming ===
The Mexican was filmed in Real de Catorce, San Luis Potosí, and Toluca International Airport in Toluca, State of Mexico, as well as various locations in Las Vegas, Nevada, and Los Angeles, California.

== Reception ==
=== Box office ===
The Mexican debuted at #1 at the North American box office ahead of Hannibal and See Spot Run, earning $20.1 million in its opening weekend. Despite a 39% decline in the following week, the film retained the top spot for a second consecutive week. By the end of its theatrical run, The Mexican had grossed $147.8 million worldwide.

=== Critical reception ===
The Mexican holds a 54% rating on Rotten Tomatoes based on 133 reviews, with an average rating of 5.6/10. The site's critical consensus reads, "Though The Mexican makes a good attempt at originality, its ponderous length makes it wear out its welcome. Also, those looking forward to seeing Roberts and Pitt paired up may end up disappointed, as they are kept apart for most of the movie." On Metacritic, the film has a score of 43 out of 100, based on 35 critics, indicating "mixed or average reviews." Additionally, audiences polled by CinemaScore gave the film an average grade of "C" on an A+ to F scale.

The Cedar Rapids Gazette praised the film, stating, "The scenes between Roberts and Gandolfini make the film special. ... Their dialogue scenes are the best reason to see the film."

The Doylestown Intelligencer remarked, "Pitt and Roberts are good too – maybe better like this than if they were together. ... If it had been a Pitt/Roberts two-hander, there wouldn't have been room for Gandolfini's wonderful character, and that would have been a shame."

The Titusville Herald commented, "The Mexican is sporadically entertaining. It works when Gandolfini is on screen; when he leaves, he takes the movie with him. ... From here, director Gore Verbinski intercuts between two road movies, one of which (the one with Pitt) is downright boring."

The Edmonton Journal observed, "Moviegoers who have seen The Mexican aren't coming out of cinemas talking about the romantic chemistry between Julia Roberts and Brad Pitt. They're talking about the presence of tough guy James Gandolfini in the unlikely role of a gay hitman named Leroy."

The Walla Walla Union-Bulletin stated, "Roberts and Pitt are generally terrific. In The Mexican they are horrid. ... Gandolfini is a star on the rise. His work in The Mexican is solid. Frankly, he's the only bright spot in this dark and pointless movie."
