= Dump cake =

American dessert, similar to a cobbler

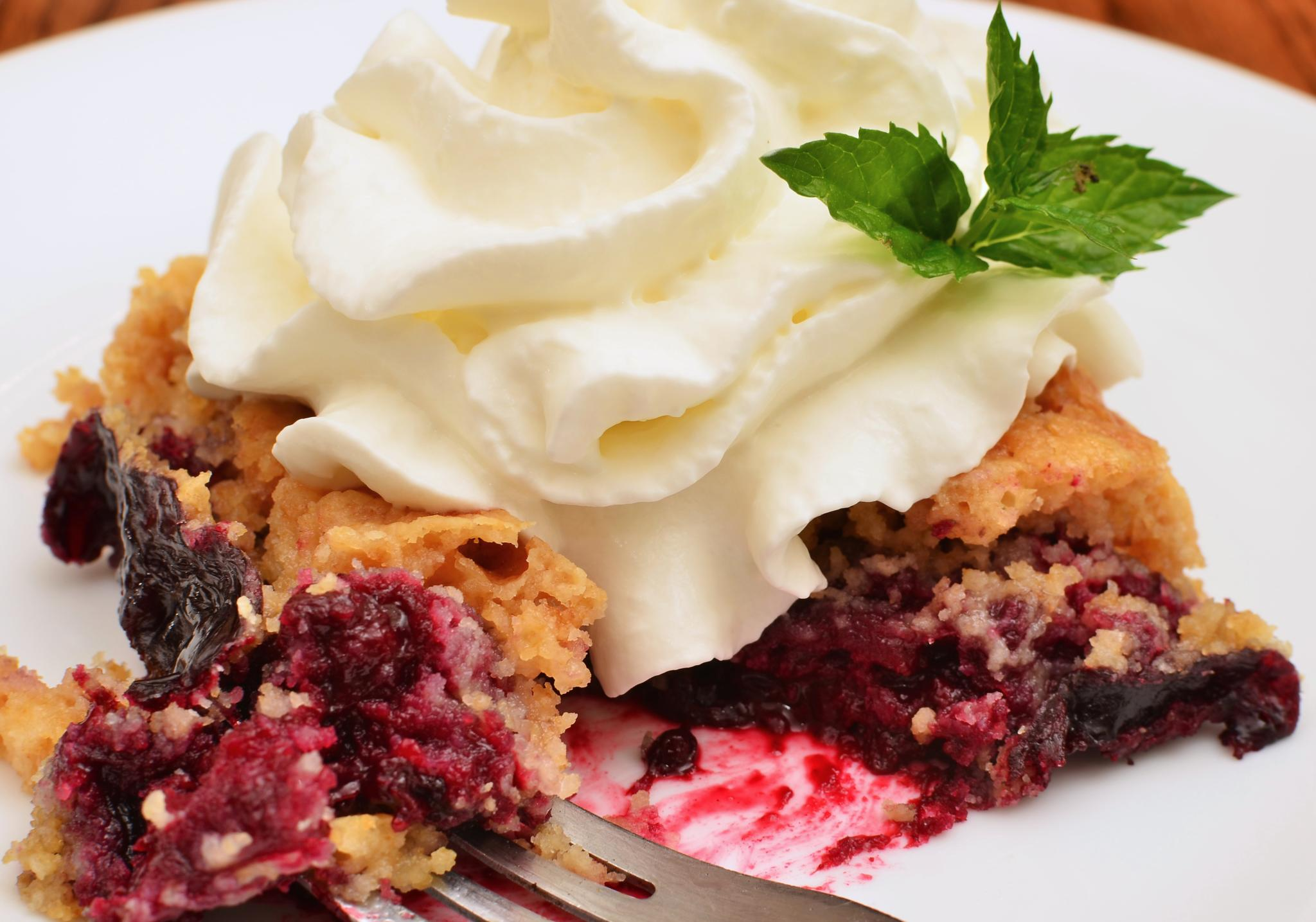
A piece of blackberry dump cake served with whipped cream.

A dump cake is an American dessert similar to a cobbler but with a cake-like topping. It is so named because it is prepared by "dumping" ingredients (typically canned fruit or pie filling, followed by a boxed cake mix) into a cake pan without mixing.

== History ==
The origins of the dump cake are somewhat unclear. It has been suggested that the name originated with a recipe published by Duncan Hines in 1980, though the name is attested in a number of American community cookbooks and periodicals from the 1970s and 60s.

Some sources have suggested the cakes became popular in the 1950s following the emergence of prepared cake mixes after World War II.

Among the earliest published recipes was submitted by a reader ("Mrs. Tom A. (Velma) Harris") to the Sapulpa Daily Herald in September 1964.

A 1968 article on dump cakes in Saskatoon's Star-Phoenix described the recipe as "going the rounds in the United States mid-west at the moment".

It has been compared to the wacky cake, another 20th century American cake which does not use eggs and which has a simple method of preparation.

== Preparation ==
A prototypical dump cake recipe begins with adding one or more cans of fruit or pie filling to a shallow baking dish. A boxed cake mix is then spread on top. This is then topped with butter or margarine (in pieces or melted), and baked in the oven. Some recipes call for the addition of further toppings such as nuts or shredded coconut.

In some variants, the cake mix may be replaced by a homemade combination of dry ingredients, and the canned fruit may be replaced or augmented with fresh or frozen fruit.

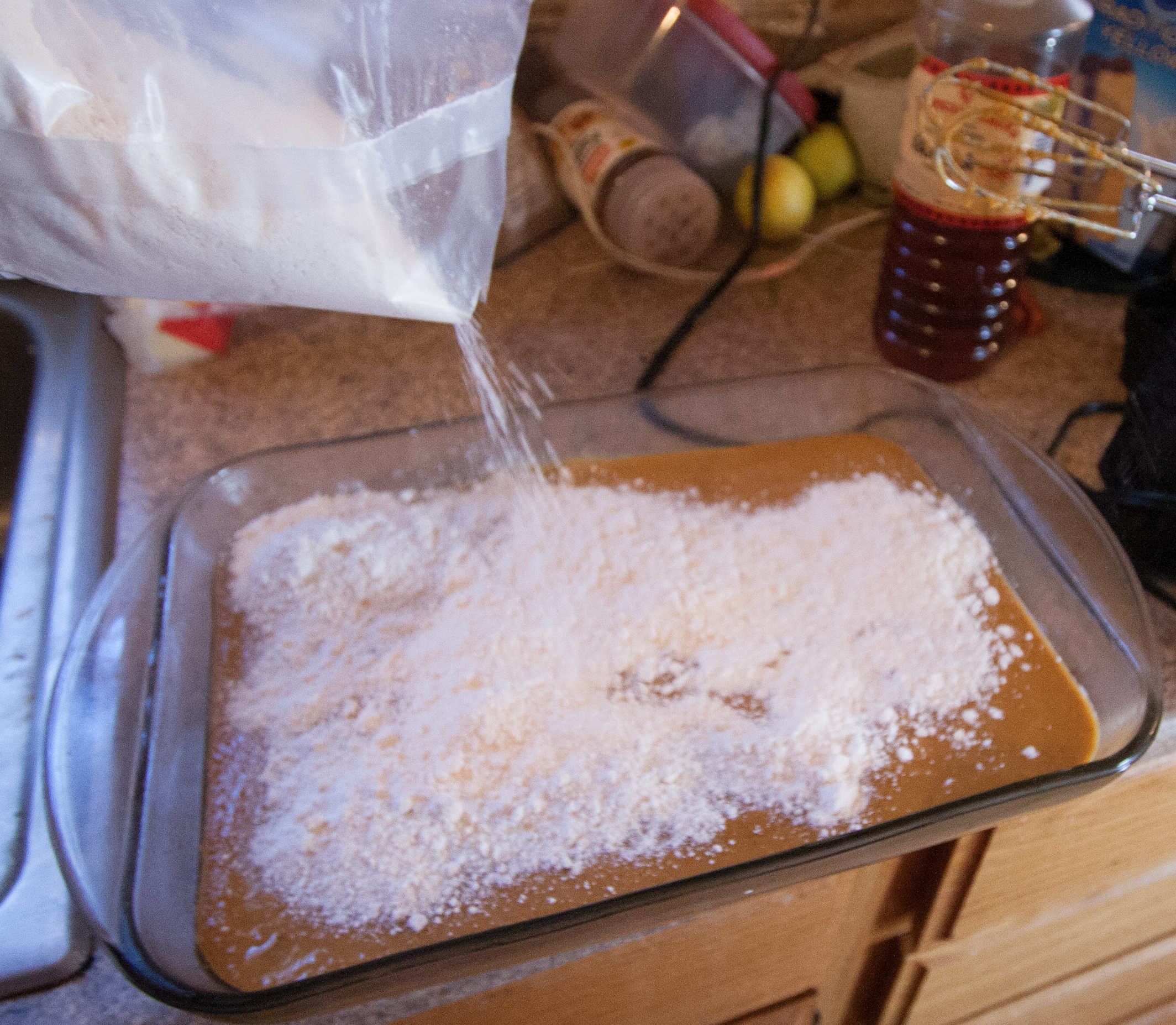
A prepared cake mix is spread on top of canned pumpkin pie filling in a rectangular baking dish.

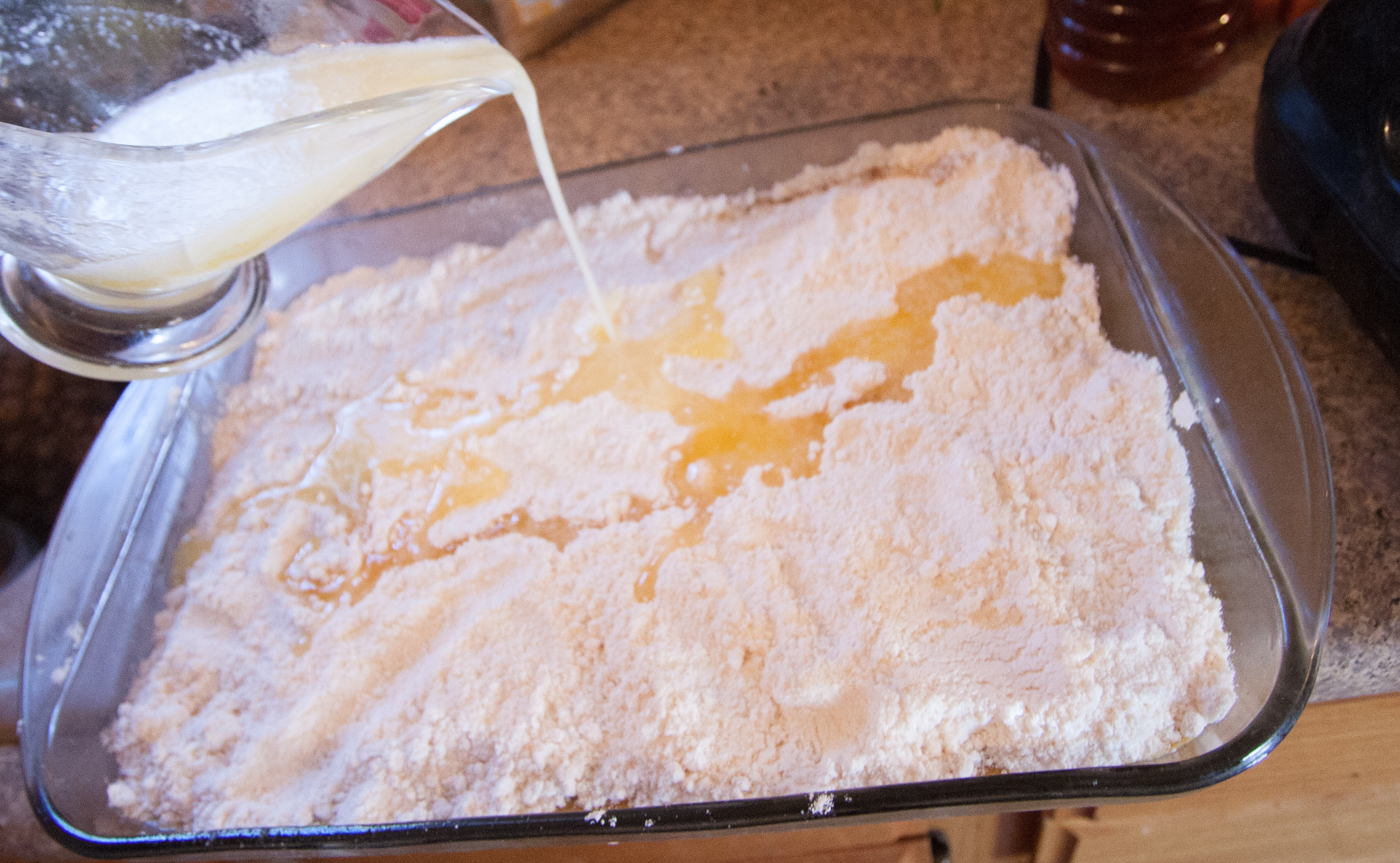
Melted butter is poured over the cake mix prior to baking. Some recipes call for solid pieces of butter instead.

== Variations ==
In Hawaii, a popular variation of the "pumpkin dump cake" is called pumpkin crunch. The earliest known published recipe for Hawaiian "pumpkin crunch cake" in 1996 identifies the dessert as a dump cake. The recipes for pumpkin crunch and mainland pumpkin dump cake are nearly identical. However, it is exclusively served as a dessert bar. After the cake is finished baking, it is chilled thoroughly before inverting the cake upside-down, with the crumb topping serving as a bottom crust and optionally topped with whipped cream. Chef Sam Choy of Hawaii is credited for popularizing this recipe.

== See also ==
- Poke cake
