= Senator Moseley =

Senator Moseley may refer to:

- Doug Moseley (1928–2017), Kentucky State Senate
- William A. Moseley (1798–1873), New York State Senate
- William Dunn Moseley (1795–1863), North Carolina State Senate
