= James Comer =

American politician (born 1972)

- Official portrait, 2020

Chair of the House Oversight Committee
- Incumbent
- Assumed office January 3, 2023
- Preceded by: Carolyn Maloney

Ranking Member of the House Oversight Committee
- In office June 29, 2020 – January 3, 2023
- Preceded by: Jim Jordan
- Succeeded by: Jamie Raskin

Member of the U.S. House of Representatives from Kentucky's 1st district
- Incumbent
- Assumed office November 8, 2016 (Note: Comer's official service begins on the date of the special election, while he was not sworn in until November 14, 2016.)
- Preceded by: Ed Whitfield

34th Agriculture Commissioner of Kentucky
- In office January 2, 2012 – January 4, 2016
- Governor: Steve Beshear; Matt Bevin
- Preceded by: Richie Farmer
- Succeeded by: Ryan Quarles

Member of the Kentucky House of Representatives from the 53rd district
- In office January 1, 2001 – January 2, 2012
- Preceded by: Billy Polston
- Succeeded by: Bart Rowland

Personal details
- Born: James Richardson Comer Jr. August 19, 1972 (age 54) Carthage, Tennessee, U.S.
- Party: Republican
- Spouse: Tamara Jo Comer (m. 2003)
- Children: 3
- Education: Western Kentucky University (BS)
- Website: House website Campaign website
- Comer's voice Comer on the impact of the Tax Cuts and Jobs Act of 2017. Recorded May 9, 2018

James Richardson Comer Jr. (/ˈkoʊmər/ KOH-mər; born August 19, 1972) is an American politician serving as the U.S. representative for Kentucky's 1st congressional district. A member of the Republican Party, he has served in Congress since 2016, during the 114th United States Congress. He previously served in the Kentucky House of Representatives and also served as the agriculture commissioner of Kentucky.

As the chair of the Oversight Committee from 2023, Comer has declined or stopped investigations into then former president Donald Trump, while starting an investigation on President Joe Biden and his family. As of August 2024, Comer's investigation has yet to unearth evidence that Biden was directly involved in or profited from his family's business activities. After Biden ended his 2024 presidential re-election campaign, Comer began an investigation into the new Democratic presidential nominee, Vice President Kamala Harris, and also began an investigation into the new Democratic vice-presidential nominee, Governor Tim Walz.

Comer served as Kentucky's agriculture commissioner from 2012 to 2016 and in the Kentucky House of Representatives from 2000 to 2012. He unsuccessfully sought the Republican nomination for governor of Kentucky in the 2015 election. A year later, he won the Republican nomination for Kentucky's 1st congressional district to succeed Ed Whitfield. On November 8, 2016, Comer won both a full term to the seat for the next Congress and a special election that allowed him to serve the remainder of Whitfield's term.

Comer is currently running for governor of Kentucky in the 2027 election, vying to succeed current governor Andy Beshear.

== Early life and education ==
Comer is a native of Carthage, Tennessee. His parents were Dr. James R. Comer Sr. (a dentist) and Sandra Witcher Comer. He grew up in Monroe County, Kentucky, graduating from Monroe County High School, Tompkinsville, Kentucky, in 1990. He received a BS in Agriculture from Western Kentucky University in 1993. In college he served as president of the Kentucky Future Farmers of America. After college, he and his family started James Comer, Jr. Farms, a 2,300 acres (950 ha) farm, and he also co-owns Comer Land & Cattle Co. He served as a director of the South Central Bank for 12 years. Comer served as president of the Monroe County Chamber of Commerce from 1999 to 2000.

== Early career ==
=== Kentucky House of Representatives ===
In 2000, Comer was elected to the Kentucky House of Representatives at the age of 27 following the retirement of incumbent Billy Polston. Comer defeated Donnie Polston, Billy's wife, for the Republican nomination.

=== Kentucky commissioner of agriculture ===
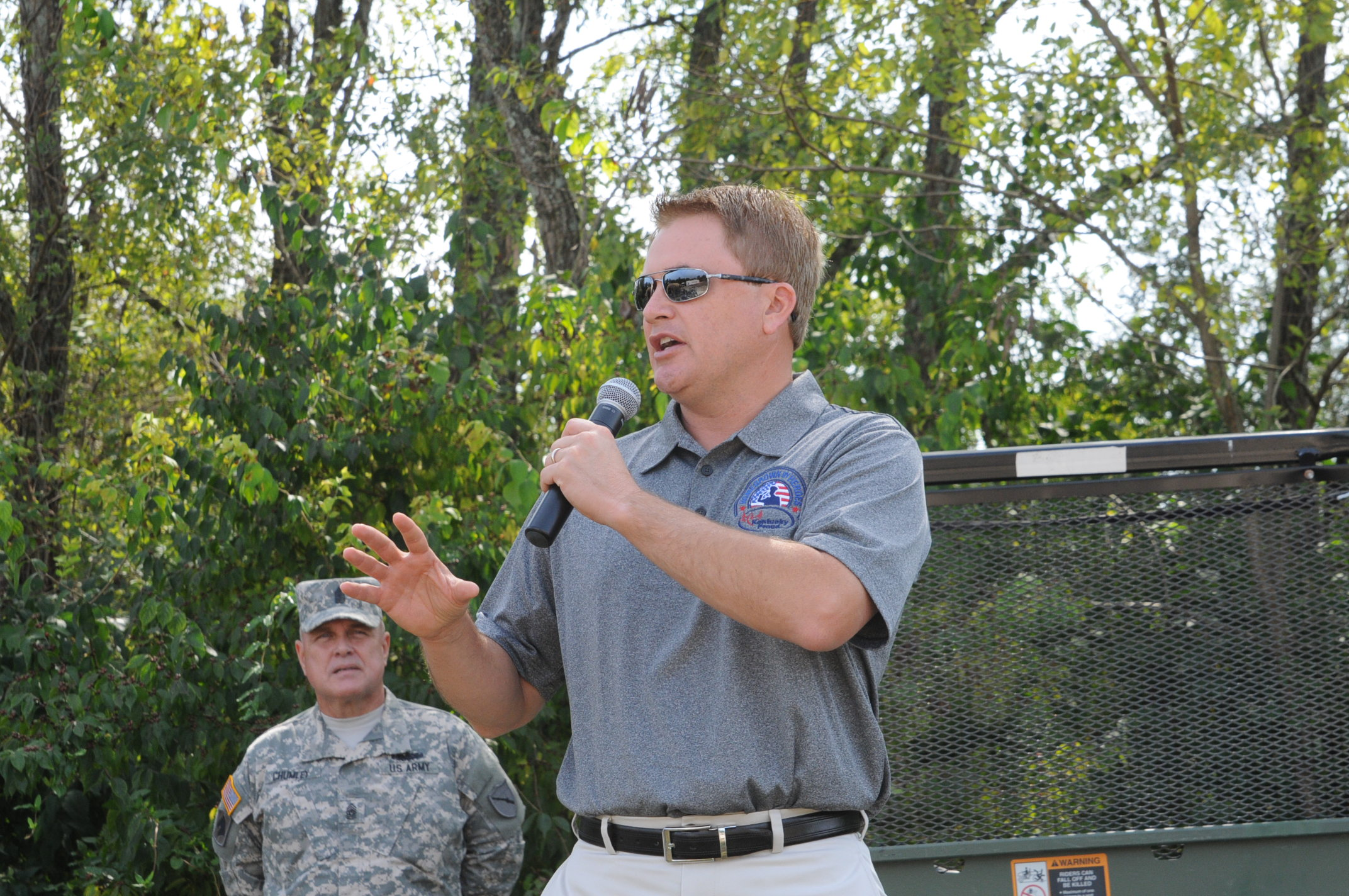
Comer speaking to members of the Kentucky National Guard in 2013

In 2011, Comer ran for agriculture commissioner. The incumbent, Richie Farmer, was term-limited. In the election, Comer was the only Republican to win election to a statewide executive office, and worked with a team of Democratic officials and under a Democratic governor. He had the highest percentage of the vote of any candidate on the ballot, and raised $606,766 to his opponent's $204,287. He took office in January 2012. One of Comer's first actions in office was to work with Democratic auditor Adam Edelen to investigate his Republican predecessor's ethics while in office.

That year Comer, became chair of the Kentucky Industrial Hemp Commission, and shortly after taking office, he called the legalization of industrialized hemp his top priority, and was "instrumental in getting the hemp industry up and running", including by founding several pilot programs in an effort to restart Kentucky's industrial hemp industry. He also filed suit against the DEA, which resulted in the DEA allowing hemp seeds to be delivered to Kentucky farmers for the first new crops. Between 2014 and 2015, Kentucky's hemp crops grew from 33 to 1,700 acres. Comer also advocated for national hemp deregulation.

Comer founded the Kentucky Proud Farm to Campus program, and created a mobile science centers program for primary and secondary school students to learn about agricultural sciences.

== Gubernatorial campaigns ==
=== 2015 gubernatorial election ===
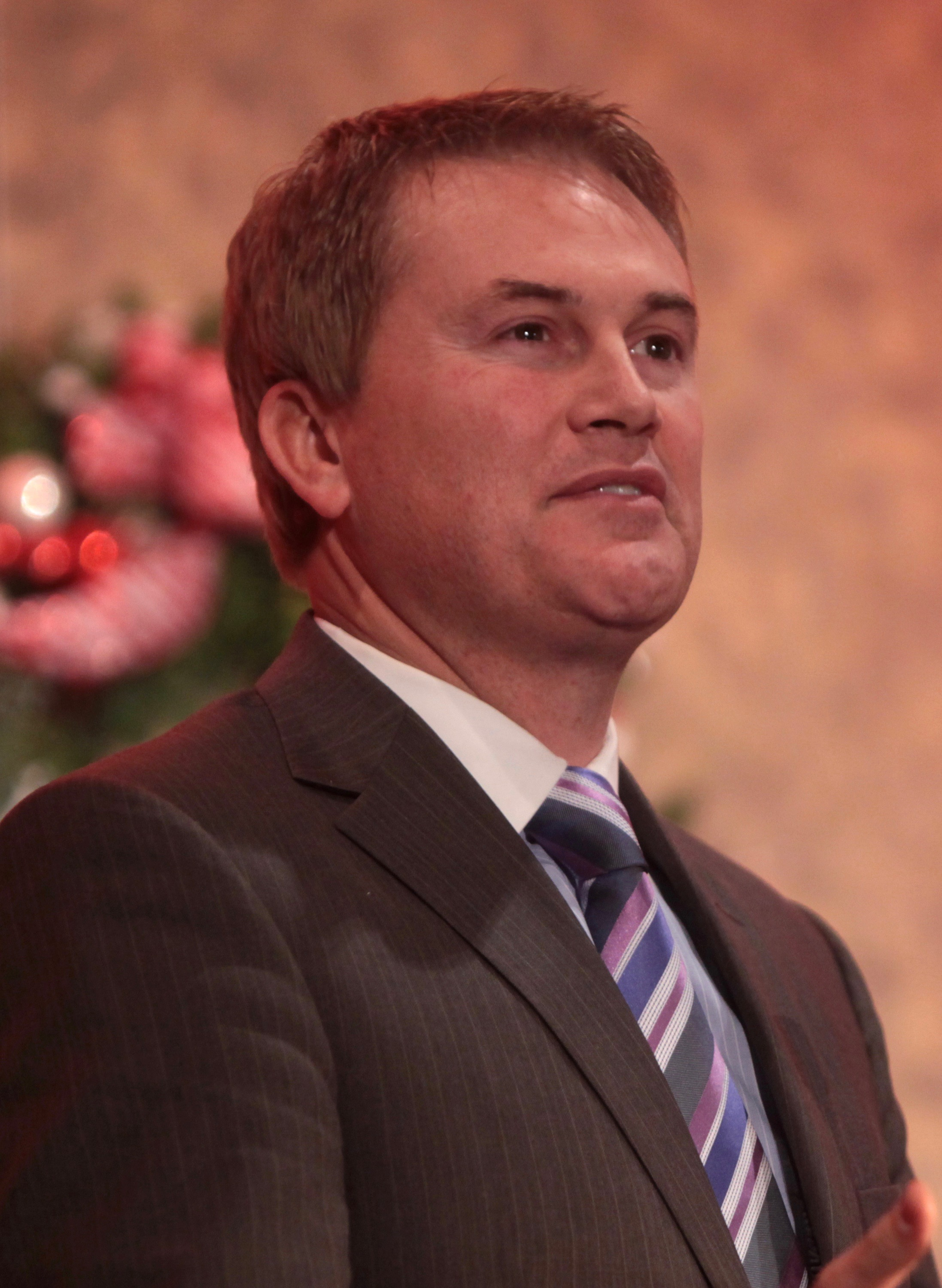
Comer in 2014

On August 2, 2014, during the annual Fancy Farm picnic, Comer announced he would seek the Republican nomination for governor of Kentucky in the 2015 election. His running mate was state senator Christian McDaniel. At the conclusion of voting in the May 19 election, Comer was 83 votes behind businessman Matt Bevin. The Associated Press, calling the race a "virtual tie", did not call it for either candidate. Comer refused to concede and said he would request a recanvass. The request was filed with the Kentucky secretary of state's office on May 20, with Secretary of State Alison Lundergan Grimes ordering the recanvass to begin at 9:00 a.m. on May 28. After the recanvass, Grimes announced that Bevin remained 83 votes ahead of Comer. She also said that should Comer want a full recount, it would require a court order from the Franklin Circuit Court. On May 29, Comer announced he would not request a recount and conceded the nomination to Bevin.

=== 2027 gubernatorial election ===
On May 7, 2026, Comer stated during a visit to Greenup County that he intended to run for governor in 2027, and would likely officially announce his run at the end of the year. Comer has been regularly cited as a potential candidate for the Republican nomination, and has been open about building a state-wide network in anticipation for the election.

== U.S. House of Representatives ==
=== Elections ===
==== 2016 ====
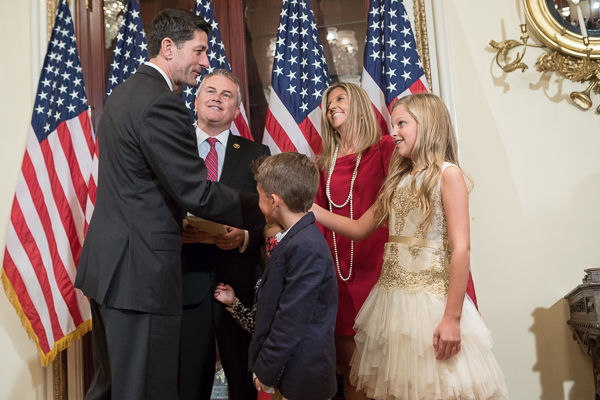
Comer being sworn in by Speaker Paul Ryan

In 2016, Comer entered the Republican primary election for the 1st congressional district of Kentucky against two other competitors. Before the primary, he was endorsed by the NRA Political Victory Fund and the US Chamber of Commerce. He won the primary with 60.6% of the vote; the real contest in this heavily Republican district. Since Whitfield had resigned in September, Comer ran in two elections on November 8–a special election for the last two months of Whitfield's 11th term, and a regular election for a full two-year term. Comer won both elections over Democratic nominee Samuel L. Gaskins with over 72% of the vote. Comer was elected to the House with 72.6% of the vote. He was sworn in soon after the results were certified, giving him two months' more seniority over the rest of the 2017 freshman class.

=== Tenure ===
During his first few months in office, Comer held several town hall meetings, where he discussed the Congress's early platform. He partnered with Murray State University to form the Congressman James Comer Congressional Agriculture Fellowship program, and advocated for agricultural legislation reform. He criticized the regulatory policies of Barack Obama, and supported the early domestic policies and actions of President Donald Trump. Comer is opposed to same-sex marriage and abortion. He believes the trade embargo on Cuba should be lifted.

Comer voted for the Tax Cuts and Jobs Act of 2017. After the bill passed, he said: "I am proud to support this critical part of President Trump's pro-growth agenda that will fulfill this promise to the American people who have struggled under the weight of Washington bureaucrats for far too long."

Comer was an original cosponsor of the Hemp Farming Act, which legalized hemp nationwide and removed federal regulations on the crop. The bill was later included in the Agriculture Improvement Act of 2018 and signed into law by President Trump on December 20, 2018. Comer was a member of the conference committee that negotiated its final version.

At the outset of the COVID-19 pandemic, Comer and Representative Suzanne Bonamici introduced legislation that would protect access to school lunches for school districts throughout the country that had to close because of the pandemic. The COVID-19 Child Nutrition Response Act allows the Department of Agriculture (USDA) to waive requirements for children to gather at schools for school officials and food service personnel to distribute reimbursable, nutritious meals. It also gives local school officials discretion over substitutions for meal components if supply or procurement is disrupted. When introducing the bill, Comer said, "this bill is a critical step toward ensuring that our students maintain access to the school meals they rely on for their health and well-being". After it cleared the House and Senate, President Trump signed the legislation into law on March 18.

After the 2022 United States House of Representatives election resulted in a House Republican majority, Comer said that the House Oversight Committee's "focus in this next Congress" would be to investigate President Joe Biden, particularly his "relationship with his family's foreign partners and whether he is a president who is compromised or swayed by foreign dollars and influence".

After Comer became chair of the Oversight Committee, he responded in January 2023 to the Joe Biden classified documents incident by calling for visitor logs for Biden's residence, where Biden's lawyers found some classified documents from his vice presidency; the same day, Comer said that he would not call for visitor logs for Trump's residence Mar-a-Lago, where an FBI search found classified documents from Trump's presidency despite Trump's lawyers' claim that no such documents were there. Comer declared he would investigate Biden because Biden "hasn't been investigated", adding: "there have been so many investigations of President Trump. I don't feel like we need to spend a whole lot of time investigating President Trump". When Comer told Fox TV's Sean Hannity, "You look at how Donald Trump is treated. He had documents in one location behind a locked door," Florida Democratic congressman Jared Moskowitz aired previously publicly widely distributed footage of large quantities boxes of classified and confidential documents in Mar-a-Lago were haphazardly stored in various places including an unlocked bathroom and on a theater stage. In March 2023, Comer confirmed that he had ended a House investigation into Trump's financial dealings, in which Trump's former accounting company, Mazars USA, had been turning over documents as part of a court-supervised settlement; the documents provided information on how foreign governments patronized the Trump International Hotel. Comer said he "didn’t even know who or what Mazars was" and that he was instead investigating "money the Bidens received from China".

When CNN asked Comer in April 2023 whether his investigation had found "anything illegal while [Joe Biden] was actually in office", he replied: "we found a lot that's certainly unethical … We found a lot that should be illegal. The line is blurry as to what is legal and not legal with respect to family influence-peddling." On September 12, 2023, Speaker Kevin McCarthy announced an impeachment inquiry into Joe Biden, and announced that he had chosen Comer to head the inquiry.

Comer discussed the impeachment inquiry into Joe Biden in October 2023, stating that "because we have so many documents, and we can bring these people in for [private] depositions or [public] committee hearings, whichever they choose". After Biden's son Hunter was subpoenaed to testify, Hunter preferred to testify publicly instead of privately, to avoid misrepresentations of the proceedings, stated Hunter's lawyer; Comer responded that the subpoenas for a private deposition were "not mere suggestions open to [Hunter] Biden's interpretation or preference".

In March 2024, Comer declared: "I am preparing criminal referrals as the culmination of my investigation" for the impeachment inquiry into Joe Biden. In June 2024, Comer made criminal referrals of Hunter Biden and James Biden to the Justice Department, over alleged refusal to provide information that The Hill reported had "limited connection" to Joe Biden. Later that month Comer insisted that "this is an investigation of Joe Biden … This was always about Joe Biden … the next step will be accountability for Joe Biden." In August 2024, The Washington Post reported that Comer's "investigation quietly sputtered out after no evidence or testimony obtained by congressional Republicans showed that the president was a direct participant in or beneficiary of his family’s business dealings … Comer himself also promised multiple criminal referrals against [Joe] Biden that never materialized."

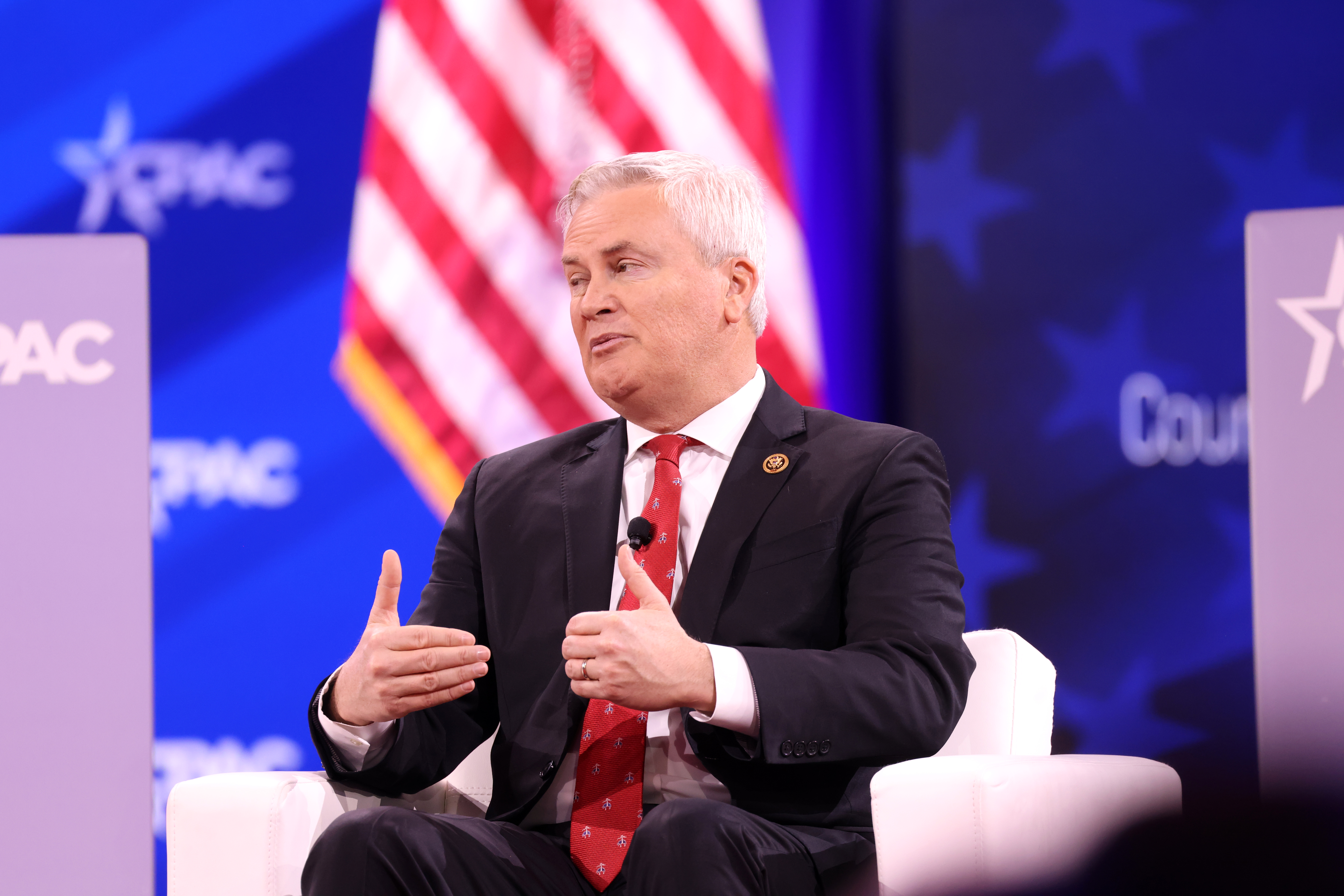
Comer at 2025 CPAC

After Joe Biden ended his 2024 presidential re-election campaign and Vice President Kamala Harris became the Democratic Party presidential nominee, Comer in August 2024 announced an investigation into Harris' actions in regard to U.S. Customs and Border Protection and the United States-Mexico border, with Comer declaring that it was "unclear what actions, if any, Vice President Harris has taken to fix the border crisis". Later in August 2024, Comer announced another investigation, this time on the Democratic Party's vice-presidential nominee, Tim Walz, the governor of Minnesota, as Comer asked the Federal Bureau of Investigation to provide information on Walz in relation to China.

In July 2026, Comer introduced legislation requiring additional congressional approval for any changes in taxes and fees by the local Washington, D.C. government.

=== Committee assignments ===
For the 118th Congress:

- Committee on Education and the Workforce
  - Subcommittee on Health, Employment, Labor, and Pensions
  - Subcommittee on Workforce Protections
- Committee on Oversight and Accountability (Chair)
  - As Chair of the committee, Rep. Comer is entitled to sit as an ex officio member in all subcommittee meetings, per the committee's rules.

=== Caucus memberships ===
- Rare Disease Caucus
- Second Amendment Caucus
- Republican Study Committee
- Congressional Coalition on Adoption
- Congressional Caucus on Turkey and Turkish Americans
- Congressional Western Caucus

== Political positions ==
=== Health care ===
Comer supports the repeal of the Affordable Care Act ("Obamacare").

=== Economic issues ===
In 2016 Comer called the Obama administration's final budget a "disaster in the making". In 2017, he voted for the Tax Cuts and Jobs Act, also denoted as the "Trump tax cuts", which was estimated to add $1.49 trillion to the national debt.

Comer opposes paid parental leave for federal workers.

=== Immigration ===
Comer opposes amnesty and sanctuary cities. He supports Executive Order 13767, the building of a wall along the Mexico–U.S. border.

=== Abortion ===
Comer is anti-abortion.

=== Marijuana ===
Comer supports declassifying marijuana as a Schedule 1 narcotic and growing hemp. In December 2017, he said there is "simply not enough support for medical marijuana legalization across the board".

=== LGBT rights ===
Comer opposes same-sex marriage. He also opposes banning discrimination based on sexual orientation and gender identity, and voted against the Equality Act in 2019. Comer voted against the Respect for Marriage Act in 2022.

=== Environment ===
In 2015, Comer said he did not believe in climate change. Comer said “We've had a very severe winter this year with 12-inch snows, so there is no global warming.” .

== Electoral history ==
Kentucky 53rd State House District Republican Primary, 2000
| Party | Candidate | Votes | % |
|---|---|---|---|
| Republican | James R. Comer | 3,969 | 81.33 |
| Republican | Donnie Mayfield Polston | 911 | 18.67 |
| Total votes | | 4,880 | 100.0 |

Kentucky 53rd State House District General Election, 2000
| Party | Candidate | Votes | % |
|---|---|---|---|
| Republican | James R. Comer | 11,051 | 100.0 |
| Total votes | | 11,051 | 100.0 |

Kentucky 53rd State House District General Election, 2002
| Party | Candidate | Votes | % |
|---|---|---|---|
| Republican | James R. Comer (incumbent) | 9,361 | 100.0 |
| Total votes | | 9,361 | 100.0 |

Kentucky 53rd State House District General Election, 2004
| Party | Candidate | Votes | % |
|---|---|---|---|
| Republican | James R. Comer (incumbent) | 12,247 | 100.0 |
| Total votes | | 12,247 | 100.0 |

Kentucky 53rd State House District General Election, 2006
| Party | Candidate | Votes | % |
|---|---|---|---|
| Republican | James R. Comer (incumbent) | 10,876 | 100.0 |
| Total votes | | 10,876 | 100.0 |

Kentucky 53rd State House District General Election, 2008
| Party | Candidate | Votes | % |
|---|---|---|---|
| Republican | James R. Comer (incumbent) | 12,482 | 100.0 |
| Total votes | | 12,482 | 100.0 |

Kentucky 53rd State House District General Election, 2010
| Party | Candidate | Votes | % |
|---|---|---|---|
| Republican | James R. Comer (incumbent) | 12,040 | 100.0 |
| Total votes | | 12,040 | 100.0 |

Kentucky Commissioner of Agriculture Republican Primary, 2011
| Party | Candidate | Votes | % |
|---|---|---|---|
| Republican | James R. Comer | 86,316 | 66.67 |
| Republican | Rob Rothenburger | 43,150 | 33.33 |
| Total votes | | 129,466 | 100.0 |

Kentucky Commissioner of Agriculture General Election, 2011
| Party | Candidate | Votes | % |
|---|---|---|---|
| Republican | James R. Comer | 519,183 | 63.79 |
| Democratic | Robert "Bob" Farmer | 294,663 | 36.21 |
| Total votes | | 813,846 | 100.0 |

Kentucky Governor Republican Primary, 2015
| Party | Candidate | Votes | % |
|---|---|---|---|
| Republican | Matt Bevin (Jenean Hampton) | 70,480 | 32.90 |
| Republican | James R. Comer (Chris McDaniel) | 70,397 | 32.87 |
| Republican | Hal Heiner (K.C. Crosbie) | 57,951 | 27.06 |
| Republican | Will T. Scott (Rodney Coffey) | 15,365 | 7.17 |
| Total votes | | 214,193 | 100.0 |

Kentucky 1st Congressional District Republican Primary, 2016
| Party | Candidate | Votes | % |
|---|---|---|---|
| Republican | James R. Comer | 24,342 | 60.59 |
| Republican | Mike Pape | 9,357 | 23.29 |
| Republican | Jason Batts | 5,578 | 13.88 |
| Republican | Miles A. Caughey Jr. | 896 | 2.23 |
| Total votes | | 40,173 | 100.0 |

Kentucky 1st Congressional District Special Election, 2016
| Party | Candidate | Votes | % |
|---|---|---|---|
| Republican | James R. Comer | 209,810 | 72.19 |
| Democratic | Samuel L. Gaskins | 80,813 | 27.81 |
| Total votes | | 290,623 | 100.0 |

Kentucky 1st Congressional District General Election, 2016
| Party | Candidate | Votes | % |
|---|---|---|---|
| Republican | James R. Comer | 216,959 | 72.56 |
| Democratic | Samuel L. Gaskins | 81,710 | 27.33 |
| Write-in | Terry McIntosh | 332 | 0.11 |
| Total votes | | 299,001 | 100.0 |

Kentucky 1st Congressional District General Election, 2018
| Party | Candidate | Votes | % |
|---|---|---|---|
| Republican | James R. Comer (incumbent) | 172,167 | 68.59 |
| Democratic | Paul Walker | 78,849 | 31.41 |
| Total votes | | 251,016 | 100.0 |

Kentucky 1st Congressional District General Election, 2020
| Party | Candidate | Votes | % |
|---|---|---|---|
| Republican | James Comer (incumbent) | 246,329 | 75.0 |
| Democratic | James Rhodes | 82,141 | 25.0 |
| Total votes | | 328,470 | 100.0 |
| Republican hold | | | |

Kentucky 1st Congressional District General Election, 2022
| Party | Candidate | Votes | % |
|---|---|---|---|
| Republican | James Comer (incumbent) | 184,157 | 74.9 |
| Democratic | Jimmy Ausbrooks | 61,701 | 25.1 |
| Total votes | | 245,858 | 100.0 |
| Republican hold | | | |

Kentucky's 1st Congressional District General Election, 2024
| Party | Candidate | Votes | % |
|---|---|---|---|
| Republican | James Comer (incumbent) | 252,729 | 74.7 |
| Democratic | Erin Marshall | 85,524 | 25.3 |
| Total votes | | 338,253 | 100.0 |
| Republican hold | | | |

== Personal life ==
Comer is married to Tamara Jo "TJ" Comer and has three children. He was baptized at First Baptist Church of Tompkinsville and is a member of Elkhorn Baptist Church in Midway, Kentucky.

=== Personal finances ===
In 2015, just before Comer started publicly running for Congress, he bought a 50% stake in six acres of Kentucky land for $128,000 from landowner Darren Cleary, a major donor to Comer's political campaigns. In 2017, Comer transferred this stake to a shell company, Farm Team Properties, that Comer owns with his wife.

Comer reported that Farm Team Companies was worth at least $500,000 in 2022, but it was "not clear" if the shell company owned any other assets, reported the Associated Press in 2023. In 2020, Comer was criticized for stock trading ahead of the COVID-19 pandemic-related 2020 stock market crash: Comer reportedly dumped shares in Bank of America and purchased shares of online workplace messaging company Slack.

By 2023, Comer has reported owning around 1,600 acres of land.

=== Abuse allegations ===
On May 5, 2015, Comer was accused of physical and mental abuse by Marilyn Thomas, a woman he dated while attending Western Kentucky University in 1993. He has said he believes the accusation was a political stunt to hinder his gubernatorial campaign.

== Bibliography ==
- Comer, James (January 2025). All the President's Money. Broadside Books. ISBN 978-0063420014.

Party political offices
| Preceded by Richie Farmer | Republican nominee for Agriculture Commissioner of Kentucky; 2011 | Succeeded by Ryan Quarles |
Political offices
| Preceded by Richie Farmer | Agriculture Commissioner of Kentucky; 2012–2016 | Succeeded by Ryan Quarles |
U.S. House of Representatives
| Preceded by Ed Whitfield | Member of the U.S. House of Representatives from Kentucky's 1st congressional district 2016–present | Incumbent |
| Preceded by Jim Jordan | Raking Member of the House Oversight Committee; 2020–2023 | Succeeded by Jamie Raskin |
| Preceded by Carolyn Maloney | Chair of the House Oversight Committee; 2023–present | Incumbent |
U.S. order of precedence (ceremonial)
| Preceded by Warren Davidson | United States representatives by seniority 151st | Succeeded by Dwight Evans |
