= Ray Mullinix =

American politician

Member of the Kentucky House of Representatives from the 53rd district
- In office January 1, 1989 – January 1, 1997
- Preceded by: Mae Hoover
- Succeeded by: Billy Polston

Personal details
- Born: September 4, 1948
- Died: July 26, 2002 (aged 53)
- Party: Republican

Raymond Graham “Ray” Mullinix (September 4, 1948 – July 26, 2002) was an American politician from Kentucky who was a member of the Kentucky House of Representatives from 1989 to 1997. Mullinix was first elected in 1988 after incumbent representative Mae Hoover retired. He was defeated for renomination in 1996 by Billy Polston.

He died in July 2002 at age 53.
