= Poke cake =

American dessert

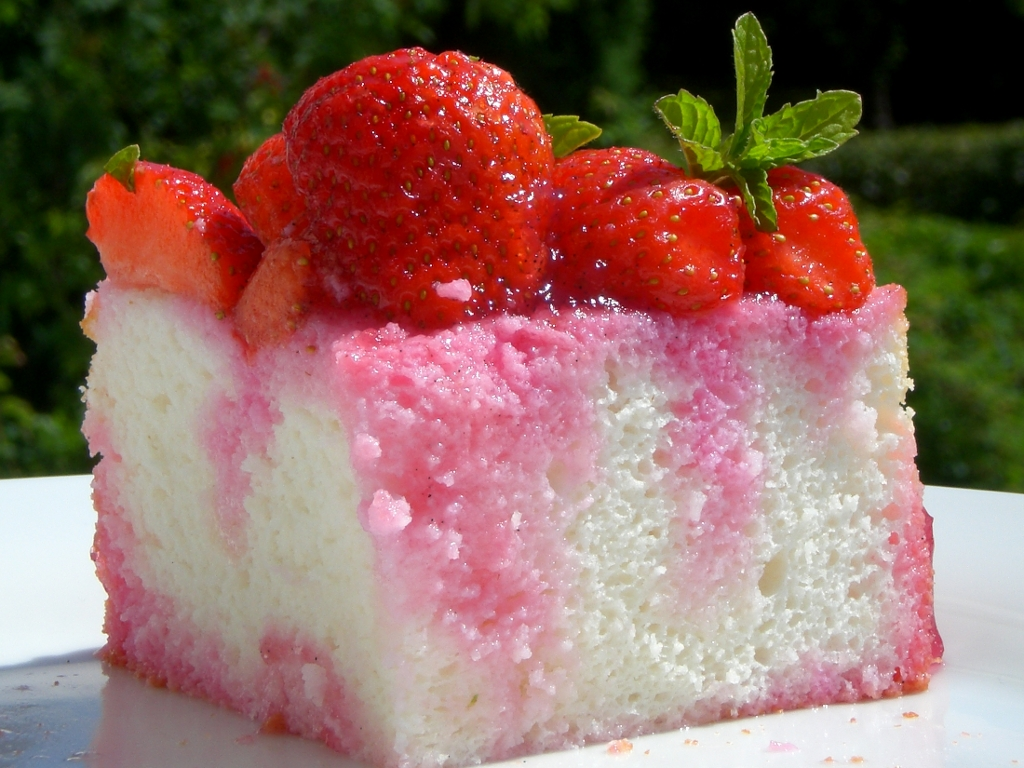
- A poke cake topped with sliced strawberries
- Type: Cake
- Course: Dessert
- Region or state: United States

Poke cake is an American dessert made with sheet cake and flavored gelatin.

== Preparation ==
Poke cake is made by baking a sheet cake, often using boxed cake mix. After the cake has been baked, holes are poked into the top using a utensil like a fork, wooden spoon handle, straw, or skewer. A liquid topping such as gelatin, pudding, sweetened condensed milk, syrup or pureed fruit is poured over the top of the cake so that it can seep into the holes. The cake is often topped with frosting, whipped cream, or Cool Whip.

The most common variation involves combining gelatin mix and warm water, and then pouring the liquid over a sheet cake. The cake is then refrigerated until it has set.

== History ==
The recipe was introduced by Jell-O in the 1970s as a way to increase sales of its instant gelatin dessert. The earliest versions used white sheet cake covered with various gelatin mixes. They are commonly served at potlucks and pool parties in the United States. There were poke style cakes prior to this in the 1800s, at least. Lady Judith Montefiore has a recipe for a Siesta Cake, that has clarified sugar poured into holes made with a silver skewer, in her "The Jewish Manual" cookbook.

== See also ==
- Dump cake
- Jello salad
