= Mae Hoover =

American politician (1938–2008)

Member of the Kentucky House of Representatives from the 53rd district
- In office February 6, 1987 – January 1, 1989
- Preceded by: David L. Williams
- Succeeded by: Ray Mullinix

Personal details
- Born: January 28, 1938
- Died: June 6, 2008 (aged 70)
- Party: Republican
- Relations: Jeff Hoover (son)

Mae Hoover (née Turner; January 28, 1938 – June 6, 2008) was an American politician from Kentucky who was a member of the Kentucky House of Representatives from 1987 to 1989. Hoover was elected to the house in a January 1987 special election following the death of her husband Welby Hoover, who had been elected to the seat the previous November. She did not seek reelection to a full term in 1988.

Hoover died in June 2008 at age 70. She was the mother of Jeff Hoover, who also served as a member of the House and was briefly its speaker.
