= Billy Polston =

American politician

Member of the Kentucky House of Representatives from the 53rd district
- In office January 1, 1997 – January 1, 2001
- Preceded by: Ray Mullinix
- Succeeded by: James Comer

Personal details
- Born: May 5, 1937
- Died: January 2, 2001 (aged 63)
- Party: Republican

Billy Dale Polston (May 5, 1937 – January 2, 2001) was an American politician from Kentucky who was a member of the Kentucky House of Representatives from 1997 to 2001. Polston was first elected in 1996, defeating incumbent Republican representative Ray Mullinix for renomination. He did not seek reelection in 2000. His wife, Donnie, lost the Republican nomination to James Comer.

He died in January 2001 at age 63. He died the day after his second term in the legislature ended.
