= Kentucky's 53rd House of Representatives district =

American legislative district

Kentucky's 53rd State House of Representatives district
Representative
James Tipton; R–Taylorsville
since January 1, 2015
- Registration: 57.6% Republican; 33.3% Democratic; 8.5% No party preference
- Demographics: 92.2% White; 1.5% Black; 2.6% Hispanic; 0.4% Asian; 0.3% Other; 3.0% Multiracial
- Population (2024): 44,546
- Registered voters (2026): 34,883

Kentucky's 53rd House of Representatives district is one of 100 districts in the Kentucky House of Representatives. Located in the central part of the state, it comprises Anderson and Spencer Counties. It has been represented by James Tipton (R–Taylorsville) since 2015. As of 2024, the district had a population of 44,546.

== Voter registration ==
On January 1, 2026, the district had 34,883 registered voters, who were registered with the following parties.

Party	Registration	
Party	Voters	%
Republican	20,107	57.64
Democratic	11,622	33.32
Independent	1,566	4.49
Libertarian	147	0.42
Green	18	0.05
Constitution	4	0.01
Socialist Workers	4	0.01
Reform	4	0.01
"Other"	1,411	4.04
Total	34,883	100.00

== List of members representing the district ==
Member	Party	Years	Electoral history	District location
Richard Fryman (Albany)	Republican	January 1, 1980 – January 1, 1985	Elected in 1979. Reelected in 1981. Lost renomination.	1974–1985; Clinton, Cumberland, Russell (part), and Wayne Counties.
David L. Williams (Burkesville)	Republican	January 1, 1985 – January 1, 1987	Elected in 1984. Retired to run for the Kentucky Senate.	1985–1993; Clinton, Cumberland, Russell (part), and Wayne Counties.
Vacant		January 1, 1987 – February 6, 1987	Representative-elect Welby Hoover died December 16, 1986.	1985–1993; Clinton, Cumberland, Russell (part), and Wayne Counties.
Mae Hoover (Jamestown)	Republican	February 6, 1987 – January 1, 1989	Elected to finish her husband's term. Retired.	1985–1993; Clinton, Cumberland, Russell (part), and Wayne Counties.
Ray Mullinix (Burkesville)	Republican	January 1, 1989 – January 1, 1997	Elected in 1988. Reelected in 1990. Reelected in 1992. Reelected in 1994. Lost renomination.	1985–1993; Clinton, Cumberland, Russell (part), and Wayne Counties.
Ray Mullinix (Burkesville)	Republican	January 1, 1989 – January 1, 1997	Elected in 1988. Reelected in 1990. Reelected in 1992. Reelected in 1994. Lost renomination.	1993–1997; Adair, Clinton, Cumberland, and Wayne (part) Counties.
Billy Polston (Tompkinsville)	Republican	January 1, 1997 – January 1, 2001	Elected in 1996. Reelected in 1998. Retired.	1997–2003
James Comer (Tompkinsville)	Republican	January 1, 2001 – January 2, 2012	Elected in 2000. Reelected in 2002. Reelected in 2004. Reelected in 2006. Reelected in 2008. Reelected in 2010. Resigned after being elected Kentucky Commissioner of Agriculture.	1997–2003
James Comer (Tompkinsville)	Republican	January 1, 2001 – January 2, 2012	Elected in 2000. Reelected in 2002. Reelected in 2004. Reelected in 2006. Reelected in 2008. Reelected in 2010. Resigned after being elected Kentucky Commissioner of Agriculture.	2003–2015
Bart Rowland (Tompkinsville)	Republican	February 14, 2012 – January 1, 2015	Elected to finish Comer's term. Reelected in 2012. Redistricted to the 21st district.	2003–2015
James Tipton (Taylorsville)	Republican	January 1, 2015 – present	Elected in 2014. Reelected in 2016. Reelected in 2018. Reelected in 2020. Reelected in 2022. Reelected in 2024. Reelected in 2026.	2015–2023
James Tipton (Taylorsville)	Republican	January 1, 2015 – present	Elected in 2014. Reelected in 2016. Reelected in 2018. Reelected in 2020. Reelected in 2022. Reelected in 2024. Reelected in 2026.	2023–present
