= Gillette News-Record =

American newspaper in Gillette, Wyoming

Gillette News Record, LLC.
- Watching out for you since 1904
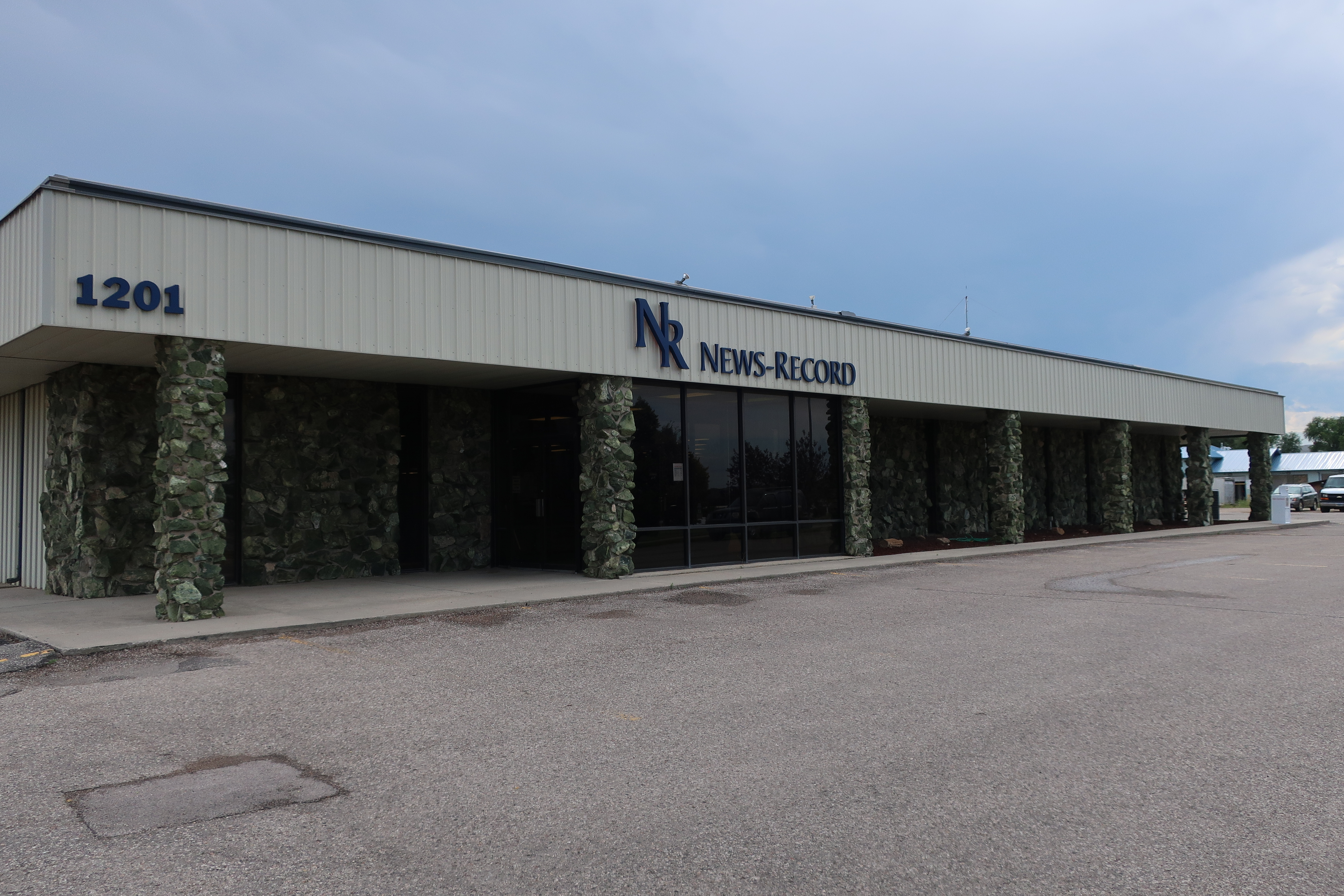
- The News-Record headquarters
- Type: Daily newspaper
- Format: Broadsheet
- Owner: J. Louie Mullen
- Founder: H.C. Hensel
- Publisher: Erik Bergquist
- Editor: Jonathan Gallardo
- Founded: 1891; 135 years ago (as Gillette News)
- Language: English
- Headquarters: 1001 S. Douglas Hwy., Suite B3; Gillette, WY 82716
- City: Gillette, Wyoming
- Circulation: 3,695
- ISSN: 2834-1430 (print); 2834-1449 (web)
- OCLC number: 669844534
- Website: gillettenewsrecord.com

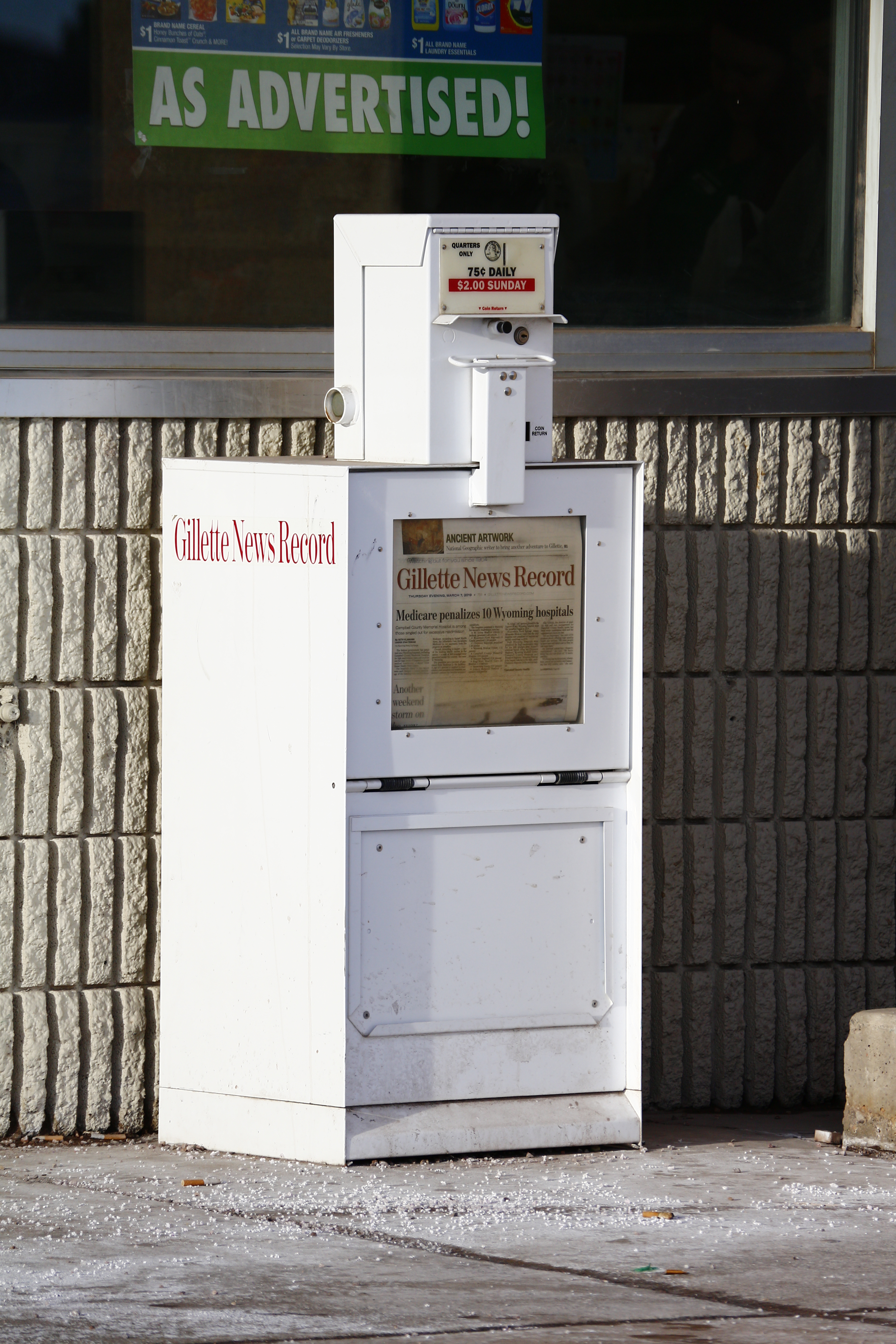
A Gillette News-Record vending machine in front of a Dollar Tree in Gillette

The Gillette News Record is a daily newspaper published in Gillette, Wyoming. It was founded in 1891, and is owned by J. Louis Mullen.

== History ==
In July 1891, H.C. Hensel and the other proprietors of The Newcastle Journal established the Gillette News. John S. Taylor was named News editor. A year later the News was sold to a syndicate of Crook County democrats.

In 1914, Joseph K. Hare established the Campbell County Record in Gillette, Wyoming. He was succeeded as owner by S.D. Perry in 1920, P.E. Douglas in 1921, and Arthur "Art" Nisselius in 1922. Nisselius acquired the Gillette News in 1925 and merged it with his paper to form the News-Record. In 1928, Nisselius sold the paper to the McCracken family. In 1935, the paper expanded from a weekly to a daily. In 1936, Nisselius bought the News-Record back. In 1940, he reverted it back to a weekly.

Art Nisselius ran the business with his wife Haze Nisselius until his death in 1962. She continued publishing the News-Record with her son Jack Nisselius until her retirement in 1967. In 1970, Bruce Kennedy became co-publisher. In 1975, the paper expanded from a weekly to a daily again. Circulation then was 5,700.

In 1981, a sixth print day was added. In 1989, Ron Franscell became editor and his wife Ann Franscell was hired as a reporter. In 1991, Jack Nisselius sold the paper to Kennedy and the Franscells. Paul Treide, one of three co-publishers, continued on as general manager. At that time the circulation was 7,000. In 2022, J. Louie Mullen purchased the paper from the Kennedy family.
