= Hollywood Sun-Tattler =

The Hollywood Sun-Tattler was a daily newspaper serving Hollywood and southern Broward County, Florida.

== History ==
In 1932, the South Broward Tattler newspaper was launched. In 1935, the Hollywood Sun was established as a competing weekly. In 1942, it was combined with the South Broward Tattler and the Hollywood News (established in 1924), adopting the Hollywood Sun-Tattler name that it would use for most of its history. The first owner of the newspaper was Wallace Stevens, and the paper was acquired by the E. W. Scripps Company in 1965. In 1989, it was purchased again and reverted to the Hollywood Sun name.

In December 1991, the paper, which as of 1989 had had a circulation of 31,000, ceased operation.
