= Meyer Fryman House =

Historic house in Michigan, United States

- U.S. National Register of Historic Places
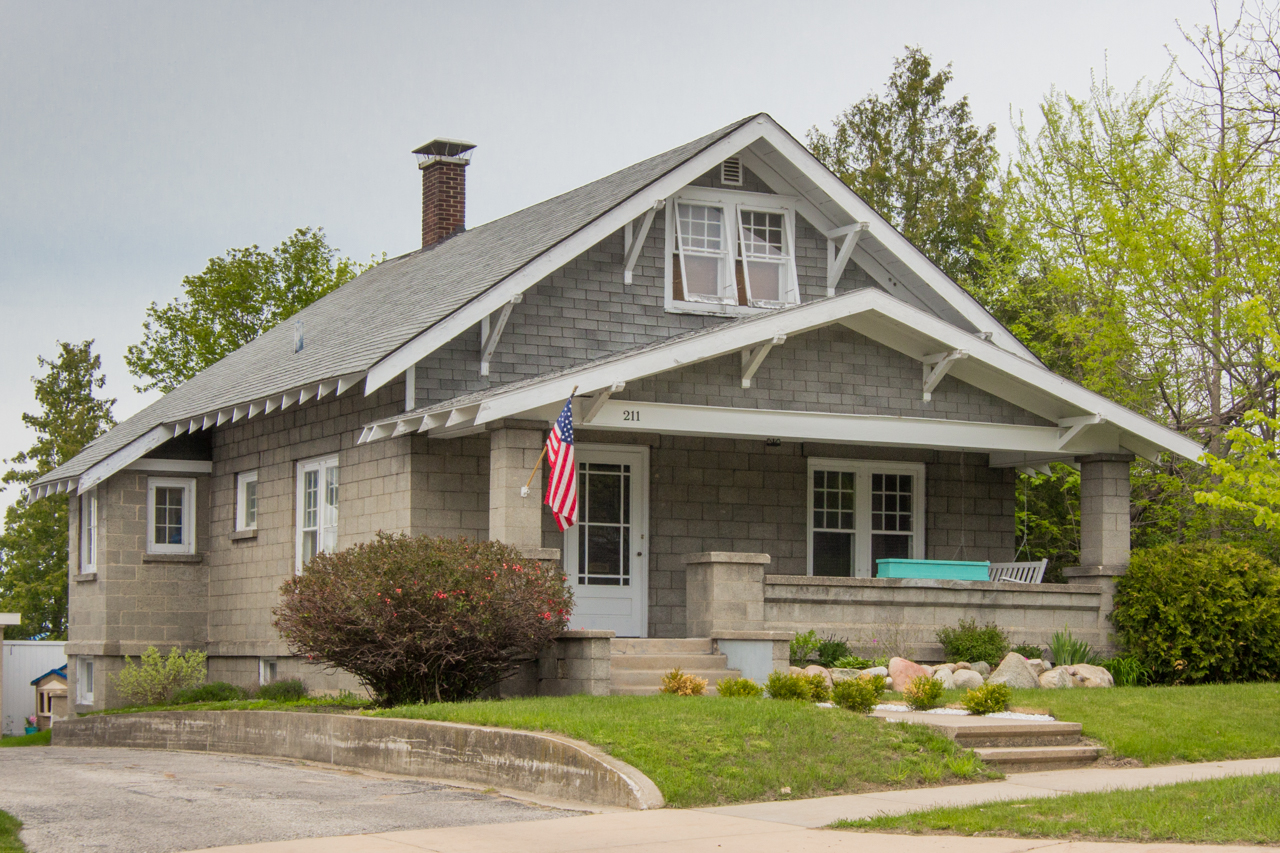

- Location within Michigan Location within the United States
- Interactive map
- Location: 211 Michigan St., Petoskey, Michigan
- Coordinates: 45°22′23″N 84°57′29″W
- Area: 0.3 acres (0.12 ha)
- Built: 1902
- Architectural style: Colonial Revival, Bungalow/craftsman
- MPS: Petoskey MRA
- NRHP reference No.: 86002002
- Added to NRHP: September 10, 1986

The Meyer Fryman House is a private house located at 211 Michigan Street in Petoskey, Michigan. It was placed on the National Register of Historic Places in 1986. The house is unusual in Petoskey, in that it is constructed of concrete blocks.

The Meyer Fryman House is 1 1/2-story font-gable bungalow constructed of concrete blocks. It has a gabled front porch, and a single-story wing extends to the rear. The eaves are exposed on the sides of the house, and the windows have multi-paned units over single lights.

The house was constructed in the early 20th century, possibly as early as 1902. It is associated with Meyer Fryman, who owned a shoe business.
