= Richard Fryman =

American politician

Member of the Kentucky House of Representatives from the 53rd district
- In office January 1, 1980 – January 1, 1985
- Preceded by: Randolph Smith
- Succeeded by: David L. Williams

Personal details
- Born: Montgomery County, Kentucky, United States
- Party: Republican

James Richard Fryman (September 23, 1935 – December 17, 2021) was an American politician in the state of Kentucky. He served in the Kentucky House of Representatives as a Republican from 1980 to 1985.
