= Doug Moseley =

American politician and minister

Member of the Kentucky Senate from the 16th district
- In office January 1, 1974 – January 1, 1987
- Preceded by: James A. Hicks
- Succeeded by: David L. Williams

Personal details
- Born: March 24, 1928 Bowling Green, Warren County, Kentucky, USA
- Died: November 8, 2017 (aged 89)
- Party: Republican
- Spouse: Betty Jean Wyant Moseley
- Children: J Lewis Moseley Rebekah Ellen Bragg Leslie Anne Watkiins
- Education: Kentucky Wesleyan College; Candler School of Theology at Emory University
- Profession: Clergyman; Professor and College administrator

Douglas Dewayne Moseley, known as Doug Moseley (March 24, 1928 – November 8, 2017), was a Kentucky minister and politician who served in the Kentucky Senate from 1974 to 1987.

Moseley died on November 8, 2017, at Hospice House in Southern Kentucky.

Kentucky Senate
| Preceded by James A. Hicks | Kentucky State Senator from District 16; 1974-1986 | Succeeded by David Lewis Williams |
