= Sapulpa Herald =

Sapulpa Daily Herald
- Type: Biweekly newspaper
- Format: Broadsheet
- Owner: Wesner Media
- Founder(s): John W. Young and O.S. Todd
- Publisher: Scott Wesner
- Founded: 1914
- Headquarters: 20 E. Lee Ave. Sapulpa, Oklahoma 74066
- Circulation: 2,900 bi-weekly
- Website: sapulpaherald.com

The Sapulpa Herald, published in Sapulpa, Oklahoma, is a bi-weekly newspaper, with a Weekday Edition (Wednesday) and a Weekend Edition (Saturday). It is owned by the Sumner family, who also own four other Oklahoma papers.

== History ==
Founded in September 1914 by John W. Young and O.S. Todd, the Sapulpa Daily Herald later merged with the older Sapulpa Evening Light – the city's oldest newspaper, founded in 1896 as a weekly, and relaunched as a daily in 1908 – when the Light's publisher, Oren Miller Irelan, entered a partnership with Young. By the time the two sold the Herald to R. P. Matthews in 1944, it was one of only two newspapers in the city (there had, at one point, been six).

The Matthews family sold to Ed Livermore in 1959; he bought out his only competitor, the weekly County Democrat News, in 1965. Livermore, a Sapulpa resident after whom the University of Oklahoma journalism chair is named, was the last local owner. He sold the Herald to Roy H. Park in 1979; Park sold to Community Newspaper Holdings in 1997. The Herald changed owners again in October 2007, when CNHI sold it and two other papers to the Sumner family.

In 2022, the newspaper temporarily joined forces with the Sapulpa Times, a rival newspaper founded in 2015., but that arrangement ended in August, 2023.

The newspaper was sold in November, 2025, from the Sumner family to Wesner Media, which owns multiple small papers throughout Texas and Oklahoma. In January, 2026, the company's headquarters moved from nearby Kiefer back to downtown Sapulpa.

== 2008 presidential election ==
In 2008, the Sapulpa Daily Herald made no mention of President Obama's presidential victory. The newspaper claimed that it covered local news and not national news. The move prompted protests that the newspaper was practicing racism. The newspaper's publisher explained "We run a newspaper, not a memory book service. We covered the local commissioner's race. We thought that was more important."
