= Titusville Herald =

Newspaper of Titusville, Pennsylvania

The Titusville Herald
- Type: Daily newspaper
- Format: Broadsheet
- Founder(s): William Wirt Bloss and Henry Culver Bloss
- Publisher: Michael Sample
- Editor: Lori Drumm
- Founded: June 14, 1865
- Ceased publication: November 5, 2022
- Headquarters: 209 W. Spring Street Titusville, PA 16354
- Website: titusvilleherald.com

The Titusville Herald was a morning daily newspaper, published in Titusville, Pennsylvania and covering news in Crawford County. Founded in June 1865 by brothers William and Henry Bloss, it was the oldest daily newspaper in the Pennsylvania Oil Region until it ceased print on November 5, 2022.

== Founding and early history ==
The Titusville Morning Herald was founded on June 14, 1865, by brothers William and Henry Bloss. William, born in Rochester on March 25, 1831, was both a newspaperman and an abolitionist. After serving in the American Civil War, he migrated to Western Pennsylvania in search of opportunities in the burgeoning oil industry. William, joined by his brother Henry, purchased the Titusville Gazette and Oil Creek Reporter in 1865. The brothers regularly disagreed about management of the paper. In 1872, Henry and his partner, J. H. Cogwell, bought William's share of the newspaper. Henry continued to grow the paper, purchasing various other local newspapers including the Evening Courier, the Evening Club, the Evening Journal, the Morning Star, the Evening Press, the Evening News, and the Daily Courier.

When Henry Bloss died in 1893, his wife Sarah ran the paper until her death in 1916. Their son, Joseph Bloss, took over the paper and ran it until 1921.

== Later ownership and management ==
After Joseph Bloss' tenure as editor, the Herald was sold to Edgar Taft Stevenson. Edgar Stevenson, called "the newspaper man's newspaper man", edited the newspaper until he died in 1956. Several generations of the Stevenson family published the paper.

From 1993, Michael Sample was the publisher until his death on January 3, 2022. In its latter years, the paper was printed five mornings a week, from Tuesday to Saturday. The paper ceased and printed its last issue on November 5, 2022.

== Coverage ==
In its early decades, the paper chronicled the oil industry as it developed in the wake of the discovery of petroleum in Oil Creek and its extraction with the establishment of Drake Well in 1859 by Colonel Edwin Drake. The Herald provided coverage of oil prices along Oil Creek and chronicled the establishment of the Oil Creek Railroad in 1865.

The Titusville Morning Herald also covered social issues affecting Titusville, a town that had grown exponentially in size and population during the oil boom. The paper features stories on gangs, prostitution and arson. When a devastating fire broke out in 1866, which devastated commercial buildings downtown (though sparing the Herald offices), Herald editors wrote endorsing community moves to lynch those found culpable. Although a gallows was built, in the end a citizen "vigilance committee" decided they did not have enough evidence to definitively conclude their suspects were responsible for the arson. A number were expelled from the town as "undesirables" and an ordinance allowing expulsion for disreputable behavior was passed. These measures also found support in the Herald.
