= Newspaper endorsements in the 1984 United States presidential election =

The following table is the list of newspaper endorsements in the 1984 United States presidential election. It mostly contains major and small city newspapers of 1984, which made their presidential endorsement from September–November 1984.

== List ==
Newspaper	1984 endorsement	Endorsement date	City	State	Type	1980 endorsement	Reference(s)	
Newspaper	1984 endorsement	Endorsement date	City	State	Type	1980 endorsement	1984	1980
Abilene Reporter-News	Ronald Reagan	October 28	Abilene	Texas	Daily	Ronald Reagan		
The Advocate	Walter Mondale	November 4	Stamford	Connecticut	Daily	Jimmy Carter		
Akron Beacon Journal	Walter Mondale	October 28	Akron	Ohio	Daily	Jimmy Carter		
Alamogordo Daily News	Ronald Reagan	October 28	Alamogordo	New Mexico	Daily	Unknown		
Albert Lea Tribune	Walter Mondale	November 2	Albert Lea	Minnesota	Daily	Ronald Reagan		
Albuquerque Journal	Ronald Reagan	October 28	Albuquerque	New Mexico	Daily	Ronald Reagan		
The Albuquerque Tribune (Note: The E.W. Scripps Company has endorsed the candidate on behalf of the paper.)	Ronald Reagan	October 29	Albuquerque	New Mexico	Daily	Ronald Reagan		
Anchorage Daily News	Walter Mondale	November 2	Anchorage	Alaska	Daily	Jimmy Carter		
The Ann Arbor News	Ronald Reagan	November 4	Ann Arbor	Michigan	Daily	Ronald Reagan		
The Anniston Star	Walter Mondale	October 31	Anniston	Alabama	Daily	Jimmy Carter		
Argus Leader	Ronald Reagan	November 4	Sioux Falls	South Dakota	Daily	Ronald Reagan		
The Arizona Daily Star	Walter Mondale	October 28	Tucson	Arizona	Daily	Jimmy Carter		
The Arizona Republic	Ronald Reagan	October 7	Phoenix	Arizona	Daily	Ronald Reagan		
Asbury Park Press	Ronald Reagan	October 28	Asbury Park	New Jersey	Daily	Ronald Reagan		
Asheville Citizen and Asheville Times	Ronald Reagan	October 28	Asheville	North Carolina	Daily	Ronald Reagan		
The Atlanta Constitution	Walter Mondale	October 19	Atlanta	Georgia	Daily	Jimmy Carter		
The Atlanta Journal	Ronald Reagan	October 26	Atlanta	Georgia	Daily	Jimmy Carter		
Auburn Journal	Ronald Reagan	November 2	Auburn	California	Daily	Ronald Reagan		
Austin American-Statesman	Walter Mondale	September 30	Austin	Texas	Daily	Jimmy Carter		
Bangor Daily News	Ronald Reagan	November 4	Bangor	Maine	Daily	Ronald Reagan		
Baraboo News Republic	Walter Mondale	November 1	Baraboo	Wisconsin	Daily	Jimmy Carter		
Battle Creek Enquirer	Ronald Reagan	October 28	Battle Creek	Michigan	Daily	Ronald Reagan		
The Bay City Times	Ronald Reagan	October 28	Bay City	Michigan	Daily	Ronald Reagan		
Beatrice Daily Sun	Ronald Reagan	October 25	Beatrice	Nebraska	Daily	Ronald Reagan		
Beaumont Enterprise	Ronald Reagan	October 28	Beaumont	Texas	Daily	None		
Belleville News-Democrat	Ronald Reagan	October 21	Belleville	Illinois	Daily	Ronald Reagan		
The Bellingham Herald	Walter Mondale	November 4	Bellingham	Washington	Daily	Jimmy Carter		
The Berkshire Eagle	Walter Mondale	November 2	Pittsfield	Massachusetts	Daily	Jimmy Carter		
The Bernardsville News	Walter Mondale	October 31	Bernardsville	New Jersey	Weekly	Jimmy Carter		
Bethany Republican-Clipper	Ronald Reagan	October 31	Bethany	Missouri	Weekly	Ronald Reagan		
The Birmingham News	Ronald Reagan	October 21	Birmingham	Alabama	Daily	Ronald Reagan		
Birmingham Post-Herald	Ronald Reagan	October 29	Birmingham	Alabama	Daily	Ronald Reagan		
The Bismarck Tribune	None	November 4	Bismarck	North Dakota	Daily	Ronald Reagan		
The Blade	Ronald Reagan	November 5	Toledo	Ohio	Daily	Ronald Reagan		
The Blue Mountain Eagle	Ronald Reagan	October 25	John Day	Oregon	Daily	Ronald Reagan		
Bluefield Daily Telegraph	Ronald Reagan	November 4	Bluefield	West Virginia	Daily	Ronald Reagan		
The Boston Globe	Walter Mondale	October 23	Boston	Massachusetts	Daily	Split (Note: The Boston Globe made endorsements for both John B. Anderson and Jimmy Carter.)		
Boston Herald American	Ronald Reagan	September 24	Boston	Massachusetts	Daily	Ronald Reagan		
Brattleboro Reformer	Ronald Reagan	October 31	Brattleboro	Vermont	Daily	John B. Anderson		
Bristol Herald Courier	Ronald Reagan	October 31	Bristol	Virginia	Daily	Ronald Reagan		
Bryan-College Station Eagle	Walter Mondale	October 21	Bryan	Texas	Daily	Unknown		
The Buffalo News	Walter Mondale	October 30	Buffalo	New York	Daily	Jimmy Carter		
The Bulletin	Ronald Reagan	November 1	Bend	Oregon	Daily	John B. Anderson		
The Burlington Free Press	Ronald Reagan	October 28	Burlington	Vermont	Daily	John B. Anderson		
The Capital Times	Walter Mondale	October 22	Madison	Wisconsin	Daily	Jimmy Carter		
Carlsbad Current-Argus	Ronald Reagan	October 31	Carlsbad	New Mexico	Daily	Ronald Reagan		
The Casper Star-Tribune	Ronald Reagan	November 4	Casper	Wyoming	Daily	Ronald Reagan		
Centre Daily Times	Walter Mondale	October 28	State College	Pennsylvania	Daily	Unknown		
The Charlotte Observer	Walter Mondale	November 4	Charlotte	North Carolina	Daily	Jimmy Carter		
The Charlotte News	Ronald Reagan	October 19	Charlotte	North Carolina	Daily	Jimmy Carter		
Chicago Tribune	Ronald Reagan	October 28	Chicago	Illinois	Daily	Ronald Reagan		
The Cincinnati Enquirer	Ronald Reagan	October 28	Cincinnati	Ohio	Daily	Ronald Reagan		
The Cincinnati Post	Ronald Reagan	October 27	Cincinnati	Ohio	Daily	Ronald Reagan		
Citizens' Voice	Walter Mondale	November 1	Wilkes-Barre	Pennsylvania	Daily	Unknown		
The Clarion-Ledger and Jackson Daily News	Ronald Reagan	October 28	Jackson	Mississippi	Daily	Ronald Reagan (Note: This was based on the Clarion-Ledger's editorial board. The endorsement from the Jackson Daily News is unknown.)		
Clearwater Sun	Ronald Reagan	October 25	Clearwater	Florida	Daily	Ronald Reagan		
The Columbian	Walter Mondale	October 30	Vancouver	Washington	Daily	Jimmy Carter		
The Commercial Appeal	Ronald Reagan	October 28	Memphis	Tennessee	Daily	Ronald Reagan		
Concord Monitor	Walter Mondale	November 3	Concord	New Hampshire	Daily	Split (Note: The Concord Monitor made endorsements for both John B. Anderson (out of protest) and Jimmy Carter (if backed into a wall).)		
Corpus Christi Caller	Ronald Reagan	October 7	Corpus Christi	Texas	Daily	Ronald Reagan		
Corpus Christi Times	Ronald Reagan	October 7	Corpus Christi	Texas	Daily	Ronald Reagan		
The Courier-News	Walter Mondale	October 31	Bridgewater	New Jersey	Daily	Jimmy Carter		
Courier-Post	Ronald Reagan	November 4	Cherry Hill	New Jersey	Daily	Jimmy Carter		
The Daily Astorian	Walter Mondale	October 31	Astoria	Oregon	Daily	John B. Anderson		
The Daily Item	Ronald Reagan	October 23	Sunbury	Pennsylvania	Daily	Ronald Reagan		
The Daily News	Walter Mondale	November 5	Longview	Washington	Daily	Jimmy Carter		
The Daily News	Walter Mondale	November 4	Port Angeles	Washington	Daily	Ronald Reagan		
The Daily News of Johnson County	Walter Mondale	October 28	Olathe	Kansas	Daily	John B. Anderson		
Daily News	Ronald Reagan	October 28	New York City	New York	Daily	Ronald Reagan		
Daily Press	Ronald Reagan	November 2	Newport News	Virginia	Daily	Unknown		
The Daily Progress	Ronald Reagan	October 28	Charlottesville	Virginia	Daily	Ronald Reagan		
Daily Star	Ronald Reagan	November 2	Hammond	Louisiana	Daily	Ronald Reagan		
The Dallas Morning News	Ronald Reagan	October 14	Dallas	Texas	Daily	Ronald Reagan		
Darien News-Review	Ronald Reagan	November 1	Darien	Connecticut	Weekly	None		
The Day	Walter Mondale	October 14	New London	Connecticut	Daily	Jimmy Carter		
Daytona Beach Morning Journal and Evening News	Walter Mondale	November 4	Daytona Beach	Florida	Daily	Jimmy Carter		
Dayton Daily News	Walter Mondale	October 14	Dayton	Ohio	Daily	Jimmy Carter		
Democrat and Chronicle	Ronald Reagan	October 28	Rochester	New York	Daily	None		
The Denver Post	Ronald Reagan	November 4	Denver	Colorado	Daily	None		
The Des Moines Register	Walter Mondale	November 4	Des Moines	Iowa	Daily	Jimmy Carter		
The Desert Sun	Ronald Reagan	October 30	Palm Springs	California	Daily	Ronald Reagan		
Detroit Free Press	Walter Mondale	October 28	Detroit	Michigan	Daily	Jimmy Carter		
East Oregonian	Walter Mondale	October 26	Pendleton	Oregon	Daily	John B. Anderson		
El Paso Herald-Post	Ronald Reagan	October 29	El Paso	Texas	Daily	Ronald Reagan		
The El Paso Times	Ronald Reagan	November 6	El Paso	Texas	Daily	Ronald Reagan		
The Elkhart Truth	Ronald Reagan	November 1	Elkhart	Indiana	Daily	Ronald Reagan		
Express-News	Ronald Reagan	October 3	San Antonio	Texas	Daily	Ronald Reagan		
The Evansville Courier	Ronald Reagan	October 29	Evansville	Indiana	Daily	Ronald Reagan (Note: The Courier's editorial board voted almost unanimously to not endorse anyone despite endorsing Reagan.)		
The Evansville Press	Ronald Reagan	October 28	Evansville	Indiana	Daily	Ronald Reagan		
The Evening Press	Ronald Reagan	November 4	Binghamton	New York	Daily	John B. Anderson		
The Flint Journal	Ronald Reagan	October 28	Flint	Michigan	Daily	Ronald Reagan		
Florence Morning News	Ronald Reagan	October 28	Florence	South Carolina	Daily	Ronald Reagan (Note: The Florence Morning News did not directly endorse Reagan but the paper predicts that he will be president.)		
The Florida Times-Union and Jacksonville Journal	Ronald Reagan	October 7	Jacksonville	Florida	Daily	Ronald Reagan		
Fort Worth Star-Telegram	Ronald Reagan	October 21	Fort Worth	Texas	Daily	Ronald Reagan		
The Forum	Ronald Reagan	October 28	Fargo	North Dakota	Daily	Ronald Reagan		
The Free Lance-Star	Walter Mondale	October 25	Fredericksburg	Virginia	Daily	Ronald Reagan		
The Fresno Bee	Walter Mondale	October 15	Fresno	California	Daily	Jimmy Carter		
The Gazette	Ronald Reagan	October 28	Cedar Rapids	Iowa	Daily	Ronald Reagan		
The Gloucester County Times	Ronald Reagan	October 28	Woodbury	New Jersey	Daily	John B. Anderson		
The Goldsboro News-Argus	Ronald Reagan	November 4	Goldsboro	North Carolina	Daily	Ronald Reagan		
Gonzales Tribune	Ronald Reagan	October 31	Gonzales	California	Daily	Unknown		
Grand Forks Herald	Walter Mondale	October 28	Grand Forks	North Dakota	Daily	Jimmy Carter		
The Grand Island Daily Independent	Ronald Reagan	October 21	Grand Island	Nebraska	Daily	Ronald Reagan		
The Grand Rapids Press	Ronald Reagan	November 2	Grand Rapids	Michigan	Daily	Jimmy Carter		
Greensboro News & Record	Walter Mondale	November 4	Greensboro	North Carolina	Daily	Split (Note: The Greensboro Daily News made endorsements for Jimmy Carter and The Greensboro Record made endorsements for Ronald Reagan.) (Note: Until 1984, both papers maintained separate editiorial staff.)		
The Greenville News and Greenville Piedmont	Ronald Reagan	October 30	Greenville	South Carolina	Daily	Unknown		
The Greenwood Commonwealth	Walter Mondale	November 4	Greenwood	Mississippi	Daily	Jimmy Carter		
The Hartford Courant	Ronald Reagan	October 28	Hartford	Connecticut	Daily	John B. Anderson		
Hattiesburg American	Ronald Reagan	October 28	Hattiesburg	Mississippi	Daily	Ronald Reagan		
Hawaii Tribune-Herald	Ronald Reagan	November 4	Hilo	Hawaii	Daily	Unknown		
The Herald	None	November 5	Everett	Washington	Daily	Jimmy Carter		
The Herald-Telephone	Ronald Reagan	October 30	Bloomington	Indiana	Daily	Ronald Reagan		
The High Point Enterprise	Ronald Reagan	November 1	High Point	North Carolina	Daily	Jimmy Carter		
The Honolulu Advertiser	Ronald Reagan	November 5	Honolulu	Hawaii	Daily	Jimmy Carter		
Honolulu Star-Bulletin	Ronald Reagan	October 31	Honolulu	Hawaii	Daily	Ronald Reagan		
Houston Chronicle	Ronald Reagan	November 4	Houston	Texas	Daily	Ronald Reagan		
The Houston Post	Ronald Reagan	October 28	Houston	Texas	Daily	None		
The Huntsville Times	None	November 4	Huntsville	Alabama	Daily	None		
The Idaho Statesman	Ronald Reagan	November 1	Boise	Idaho	Daily	Ronald Reagan		
Independent Record	Ronald Reagan	November 1	Helena	Montana	Daily	Unknown		
The Indianapolis Star	Ronald Reagan	October 28	Indianapolis	Indiana	Daily	Ronald Reagan		
Intelligencer Journal	Walter Mondale	November 2	Lancaster	Pennsylvania	Daily	Jimmy Carter		
Iowa City Press-Citizen	Ronald Reagan	November 1	Iowa City	Iowa	Daily	Ronald Reagan		
The Jersey Journal and Jersey Observer	Walter Mondale	October 25	Jersey City	New Jersey	Daily	Ronald Reagan		
Johnson City Press-Chronicle	Ronald Reagan	October 26	Johnson City	Tennessee	Daily	Ronald Reagan		
Journal Star	None	November 4	Peoria	Illinois	Daily	Ed Clark		
The Journal Times	None (Note: Although The Journal Times did not endorse made an official endorsement, the editorial board voted Regan for his "leadership capabilities and the result of his economic policies" and Mondale for his "policies regarding military spending, health/education/welfare, and foreign relations.")	November 4	Racine	Wisconsin	Daily	Ronald Reagan		
Juneau Empire	Ronald Reagan	October 30	Juneau	Alaska	Daily	Ronald Reagan		
Kalamazoo Gazette	Walter Mondale	November 4	Kalamazoo	Michigan	Daily	Jimmy Carter		
The Kansas City Star	Ronald Reagan	November 5	Kansas City	Missouri	Daily	Jimmy Carter		
Kentucky New Era	Ronald Reagan	October 31	Hopkinsville	Kentucky	Daily	Ronald Reagan		
The Knickerbocker News	Ronald Reagan	October 28	Albany	New York	Daily	Jimmy Carter		
Kilgore News Herald	Ronald Reagan	October 24	Kilgore	Texas	Daily	Ronald Reagan		
Kingsport Times-News	Ronald Reagan	October 28	Kingsport	Tennessee	Daily	John B. Anderson		
The Knoxville News-Sentinel	Ronald Reagan	October 28	Knoxville	Tennessee	Daily	Ronald Reagan		
La Crosse Tribune	Ronald Reagan	October 28	La Crosse	Wisconsin	Daily	Ronald Reagan		
Lake Charles American Press	Walter Mondale	November 4	Lake Charles	Louisiana	Daily	Unknown		
Laredo Morning Times	Ronald Reagan	November 4	Laredo	Texas	Daily	None		
Las Cruces Sun-News	Ronald Reagan	November 4	Las Cruces	New Mexico	Weekly	Ronald Reagan		
Las Vegas Review-Journal	Ronald Reagan	October 31	Las Vegas	Nevada	Daily	Ronald Reagan		
Lansing State Journal	Ronald Reagan	October 28	Lansing	Michigan	Daily	Ronald Reagan		
The Leader	Ronald Reagan	October 29	Corning	New York	Daily	Ronald Reagan		
The Leaf-Chronicle	Ronald Reagan	October 28	Clarksville	Tennessee	Daily	Ronald Reagan		
The Ledger	None	November 3	Lakeland	Florida	Daily	Ronald Reagan		
Lexington Herald-Leader	Ronald Reagan	October 28	Lexington	Kentucky	Daily	Ronald Reagan (Note: Until 1982, both papers maintained separate editiorial staff.)		
Lincoln Journal	None	November 2	Lincoln	Nebraska	Daily	None		
The Lincoln Star	Walter Mondale	October 31	Lincoln	Nebraska	Daily	Jimmy Carter		
Lompoc Record	None	November 5	Lompoc	California	Daily	Ronald Reagan		
Los Angeles Herald Examiner	Ronald Reagan	November 4	Los Angeles	Californiai	Daily	None (Note: Although the Herald Examiner didn't directly endorse any candidate, its editorial board supports Reagan.)		
Los Angeles Times	None	November 4 (Note: The Los Angeles Times does not make endorsements for president, governor, or senator as of 1973.)	Los Angeles	California	Daily	None		
Macon Telegraph and News	Ronald Reagan	October 28	Macon	Georgia	Daily	Jimmy Carter		
Manchester Union Leader	Unknown	-	Manchester	New Hampshire	Daily	Ronald Reagan		
The Miami Herald	Ronald Reagan	October 28	Miami	Florida	Daily	John B. Anderson		
The Miami News	Walter Mondale	October 15	Miami	Florida	Daily	John B. Anderson		
Midland Daily News	Ronald Reagan	November 2	Midland	Michigan	Daily	None		
Midland Reporter-Telegram	Ronald Reagan	October 14	Midland	Texas	Daily	Ronald Reagan		
The Mining Journal	Ronald Reagan	November 3	Marquette	Michigan	Daily	Ronald Reagan		
Minneapolis Star and Tribune	Walter Mondale	October 28	Minneapolis	Minnesota	Daily	Jimmy Carter		
Missoulian	Ronald Reagan	October 31	Missoula	Montana	Daily	Ronald Reagan		
The Mobile Press and Register	Ronald Reagan	October 28	Mobile	Alabama	Daily	Ronald Reagan		
The Modesto Bee	Walter Mondale	October 14	Modesto	California	Daily	Jimmy Carter		
The Monitor	None	October 28	McAllen	Texas	Daily	None		
The Morning News and Evening Journal	Walter Mondale	November 4	Wilmington	Delaware	Daily	Ronald Reagan		
The Morning Union	Ronald Reagan	October 30	Springfield	Massachusetts	Daily	Ronald Reagan		
The Muskegon Chronicle	Ronald Reagan	November 4	Muskegon	Michigan	Daily	Ronald Reagan		
New Haven Register	Ronald Reagan	October 28	New Haven	Connecticut	Daily	Ronald Reagan		
The New Mexican	Ronald Reagan	October 31	Santa Fe	New Mexico	Daily	Ronald Reagan		
New York Post	Ronald Reagan	September 24	New York City	New York	Daily	Ronald Reagan		
The New York Times	Walter Mondale	October 28	New York City	New York	Daily	Jimmy Carter		
The News & Observer	Walter Mondale	October 21	Raleigh	North Carolina	Daily	Jimmy Carter		
News-Star-World	Ronald Reagan	October 28	Monroe	Louisiana	Daily	Jimmy Carter		
The News-Times	Walter Mondale	October 28	Danbury	Connecticut	Daily	Jimmy Carter		
News-Tribune and Herald	Walter Mondale	November 4	Duluth	Minnesota	Daily	Jimmy Carter		
The Oklahoman	Ronald Reagan	October 28	Oklahoma City	Oklahoma	Daily	Ronald Reagan		
Omaha World-Herald	Ronald Reagan	October 28	Omaha	Nebraska	Daily	Ronald Reagan		
The Oregonian	Ronald Reagan	October 28	Portland	Oregon	Daily	Ronald Reagan		
The Orlando Sentinel	Ronald Reagan	November 4	Orlando	Florida	Daily	None		
The Palm Beach Post	Walter Mondale	October 28	West Palm Beach	Florida	Daily	Jimmy Carter		
The Park City Daily News	Ronald Reagan	October 28	Bowling Green	Kentucky	Daily	Ronald Reagan		
The Patriot and Evening News	Ronald Reagan	November 4	Harrisburg	Pennsylvania	Daily	None		
Philadelphia Daily News	Walter Mondale	October 26	Philadelphia	Pennsylvania	Daily	Jimmy Carter		
The Philadelphia Inquirer	Walter Mondale	October 28	Philadelphia	Pennsylvania	Daily	Jimmy Carter		
Pittsburgh Post-Gazette	Ronald Reagan	October 23	Pittsburgh	Pennsylvania	Daily	Jimmy Carter		
The Pittsburgh Press	Ronald Reagan	October 28	Pittsburgh	Pennsylvania	Daily	Ronald Reagan		
The Plain Dealer	Ronald Reagan	October 28	Cleveland	Ohio	Daily	Ronald Reagan		
Portland Press Herald	Ronald Reagan	October 29	Portland	Maine	Daily	Jimmy Carter		
Post-Bulletin	None (Note: Although the Post-Bulletin didn't directly endorse any candidate, its editorial board supports Mondale saying that, "he has the temperament and the intellect to work at the job himself.")	November 1	Rochester	Minnesota	Daily	Ronald Reagan		
The Post-Standard	Ronald Reagan	October 29	Syracuse	New York	Daily	Ronald Reagan		
Poughkeepsie Journal	Ronald Reagan	November 4	Poughkeepsie	New York	Daily	Ronald Reagan		
The Press	Walter Mondale	November 4	Atlantic City	New Jersey	Daily	None		
The Pueblo Chieftain and Star-Journal	Ronald Reagan	November 4	Pueblo	Colorado	Daily	Ronald Reagan		
Quad-City Times	Ronald Reagan	November 2	Davenport	Iowa	Daily	Ronald Reagan		
The Quincy Herald-Whig	Ronald Reagan	October 21	Quincy	Illinois	Daily	Ronald Reagan		
Rapid City Journal	Ronald Reagan	November 1	Rapid City	South Dakota	Daily	Ronald Reagan		
Ravalli Republic	None	November 2	Hamilton	Montana	Daily	John B. Anderson		
The Record	Walter Mondale	October 25	Hackensack	New Jersey	Daily	Jimmy Carter		
Record-Journal	Walter Mondale	November 2	Meriden	Connecticut	Daily	None		
The Register-Mail	Ronald Reagan	October 26	Galesburg	Illinois	Daily	Ronald Reagan		
The Register-Guard	Ronald Reagan	November 4	Eugene	Oregon	Daily	Ronald Reagan		
Richmond Times-Dispatch	Ronald Reagan	November 4	Richmond	Virginia	Daily	Ronald Reagan		
Roanoke Times and World-News	Walter Mondale	October 28	Roanoke	Virginia	Daily	Unknown		
Rockford Register Star	Walter Mondale	October 28	Rockford	Illinois	Daily	John B. Anderson		
Rocky Mountain News	Ronald Reagan	October 28	Denver	Colorado	Daily	Ronald Reagan		
Rutland Daily Herald	Walter Mondale	October 18	Rutland	Vermont	Daily	Jimmy Carter		
The Sacramento Bee	Walter Mondale	November 4	Sacramento	California	Daily	Jimmy Carter		
The Sacramento Union	Ronald Reagan	October 24	Sacramento	California	Daily	Ronald Reagan		
The Saginaw News	Ronald Reagan	November 4	Saginaw	Michigan	Daily	Ronald Reagan		
San Angelo Standard-Times (Note: Both papers are separate but they share the same editorial board.)	Ronald Reagan	October 29	San Angelo	Texas	Daily	Ronald Reagan		
San Antonio Light	Ronald Reagan	October 28	San Antonio	Texas	Daily	Ronald Reagan		
San Francisco Chronicle	Ronald Reagan	October 31	San Francisco	California	Daily	Ronald Reagan		
San Francisco Examiner	Ronald Reagan	October 28	San Francisco	California	Daily	Ronald Reagan		
Santa Barbara News-Press	Ronald Reagan	October 28	Santa Barbara	California	Daily	Ronald Reagan		
Santa Cruz Sentinel	Ronald Reagan	October 28	Santa Cruz	California	Daily	Ronald Reagan		
Sarasota Herald-Tribune	Ronald Reagan	November 4	Sarasota	Florida	Daily	Ronald Reagan		
Seattle Post-Intelligencer	Ronald Reagan	October 20	Seattle	Washington	Daily	John B. Anderson		
The Sentinel	Ronald Reagan	October 31	Carlisle	Pennsylvania	Daily	Ronald Reagan		
The Sheboygan Press	Walter Mondale	November 1	Sheboygan	Wisconsin	Daily	Jimmy Carter		
Shreveport Journal	None	October 31	Shreveport	Louisiana	Daily	Jimmy Carter (Note: Shreveport Journal's 1980 endorsement of Carter was their first Democratic presidential endorsement since they endorsed Al Smith in 1928.)		
The Sioux City Journal	Ronald Reagan	October 31	Sioux City	Iowa	Daily	Ronald Reagan		
South Bend Tribune	Walter Mondale	November 4	South Bend	Indiana	Daily	None		
Southwest Times Record	Ronald Reagan	October 28	Fort Smith	Arkansas	Daily	Ronald Reagan		
The Spokesman-Review	Ronald Reagan	October 14	Spokane	Washington	Daily	Ronald Reagan		
Springfield Daily News	Walter Mondale	October 25	Springfield	Massachusetts	Daily	Ronald Reagan		
Springfield News-Sun	Ronald Reagan	October 28	Springfield	Ohio	Daily	Jimmy Carter		
Star-Herald	Ronald Reagan	October 31	Scottsbluff	Nebraska	Daily	Ronald Reagan		
Staten Island Advance	Walter Mondale	November 4	Staten Island	New York	Daily	Jimmy Carter		
St. Cloud Daily Times	Ronald Reagan	November 2	St. Cloud	Minnesota	Daily	Ronald Reagan		
St. Joseph News-Press and St. Joseph Gazette (Note: Both papers are separate but they share the same editorial board (with the exception of the editorial page editor).)	Ronald Reagan	October 28	St. Joseph	Missouri	Daily	Ronald Reagan		
St. Louis Post-Dispatch	Walter Mondale	October 14	St. Louis	Missouri	Daily	Jimmy Carter		
St. Paul Pioneer Press	Walter Mondale	October 28	St. Paul	Minnesota	Daily	None		
St. Petersburg Times	Walter Mondale	October 28	St. Petersburg	Florida	Daily	Jimmy Carter		
Star-Gazette	Ronald Reagan	October 28	Elmira	New York	Daily	Jimmy Carter		
The State	Ronald Reagan	October 28	Columbia	South Carolina	Daily	Ronald Reagan		
The State Journal-Register	Ronald Reagan	October 26	Springfield	Illinois	Daily	Ronald Reagan		
The Sun	None	October 28	Baltimore	Maryland	Daily	Jimmy Carter		
Sun-Times	Ronald Reagan	September 23	Chicago	Illinois	Daily	Jimmy Carter		
The Tacoma News Tribune	Ronald Reagan	November 1	Tacoma	Washington	Daily	Ronald Reagan		
Tallahassee Democrat	Walter Mondale	October 28	Tallahassee	Florida	Daily	None		
The Tampa Tribune	Ronald Reagan	November 4	Tampa	Florida	Daily	Ronald Reagan		
The Taos News	Walter Mondale	November 1	Taos	New Mexico	Weekly	Jimmy Carter		
The Tennessean	Walter Mondale	October 21	Nashville	Tennessee	Daily	Jimmy Carter		
The Tifton Gazette	None	October 31	Tifton	Georgia	Daily	Jimmy Carter		
The Times	Ronald Reagan	October 28	Gainesville	Georgia	Daily	None		
The Times	Ronald Reagan	November 4	Shreveport	Louisiana	Daily	Ronald Reagan		
Times Herald	Ronald Reagan	October 28	Port Huron	Michigan	Daily	Ronald Reagan		
Times Leader	Ronald Reagan	November 2	Wilkes-Barre	Pennsylvania	Daily	Ronald Reagan		
Times-Standard	Ronald Reagan	October 30	Eureka	California	Daily	Ronald Reagan		
Times-Union	Walter Mondale	October 26	Rochester	New York	Daily	None		
Today	Ronald Reagan	October 14	Cocoa	Florida	Daily	Ronald Reagan		
Transcript-Telegram	Walter Mondale	November 3	Holyoke	Massachusetts	Daily	Ronald Reagan		
Trenton Times	Ronald Reagan	October 28	Trenton	New Jersey	Daily	None		
Tri-City Herald	Ronald Reagan	October 30	Pasco	Washington	Daily	Ronald Reagan		
Tulsa World	Ronald Reagan	October 21	Tulsa	Oklahoma	Daily	Ronald Reagan		
The Tustin News	Ronald Reagan	November 1	Tustin	California	Weekly	Ronald Reagan		
Valley News	None	November 5	West Lebanon	New Hampshire	Daily	Jimmy Carter		
Waukesha Freeman	Ronald Reagan	November 2	Waukesha	Wisconsin	Daily	John B. Anderson		
Waco Tribune-Herald	Ronald Reagan	October 28	Waco	Texas	Daily	Ronald Reagan		
Waterloo Courier	Walter Mondale	October 30	Waterloo	Iowa	Daily	None		
West Central Tribune	Walter Mondale	October 26	Willmar	Minnesota	Daily	Jimmy Carter		
The Wichita Eagle-Beacon	Ronald Reagan	November 4	Wichita	Kansas	Daily	Ronald Reagan		
Wilmington Morning Star and News	Ronald Reagan	October 21	Wilmington	North Carolina	Daily	Jimmy Carter		
Winston-Salem Journal	Walter Mondale	October 28	Winston-Salem	North Carolina	Daily	Ronald Reagan		
Wisconsin State Journal	Ronald Reagan	October 30	Madison	Wisconsin	Daily	Ronald Reagan		
Worcester Telegram and The Evening Gazette	Ronald Reagan	November 1	Worcester	Massachusetts	Daily	Ronald Reagan		
The Yuma Daily Sun	Ronald Reagan	November 4	Yuma	Arizona	Daily	Unknown		

== See also ==
- 1984 United States presidential election
- Ronald Reagan 1984 presidential campaign
- Walter Mondale 1984 presidential campaign
- Newspaper endorsements in the 1992 United States presidential election
- Newspaper endorsements in the 1996 United States presidential election
