= Newspaper endorsements in the 1988 United States presidential election =

The following table is the list of newspaper endorsements in the 1988 United States presidential election. It mostly contains major and small city newspapers of 1988, which made their presidential endorsement from September–November 1988. Newsday reverted its editorial policy and endorsed a presidential candidate since 1972.

== List ==
Newspaper	1988 endorsement	Endorsement date	City	State	Type	1984 endorsement	Reference(s)	
Newspaper	1988 endorsement	Endorsement date	City	State	Type	1984 endorsement	1988	1984
Abilene Reporter-News	George H. W. Bush	October 30	Abilene	Texas	Daily	Ronald Reagan		
The Advocate	Michael Dukakis	October 30	Stamford	Connecticut	Daily	Walter Mondale		
Agri News	Michael Dukakis	November 3	Rochester	Minnesota	Weekly	Unknown		
Albuquerque Journal	George H. W. Bush	October 30	Albuquerque	New Mexico	Daily	Ronald Reagan		
The Albuquerque Tribune (Note: The E.W. Scripps Company has endorsed the candidate on behalf of the paper.)	George H. W. Bush	November 4	Albuquerque	New Mexico	Daily	Ronald Reagan		
Anchorage Daily News	Michael Dukakis	November 4	Anchorage	Alaska	Daily	Walter Mondale		
The Ann Arbor News	Michael Dukakis	November 6	Ann Arbor	Michigan	Daily	Ronald Reagan		
Argus Leader	Michael Dukakis	November 2	Sioux Falls	South Dakota	Daily	Ronald Reagan		
The Arizona Daily Star	Michael Dukakis	October 23	Tucson	Arizona	Daily	Walter Mondale		
Asheville Citizen and Asheville Times	George H. W. Bush	October 30	Asheville	North Carolina	Daily	Ronald Reagan		
The Atlanta Constitution	Michael Dukakis	October 23	Atlanta	Georgia	Daily	Walter Mondale		
The Atlanta Journal	George H. W. Bush	October 26	Atlanta	Georgia	Daily	Ronald Reagan		
Bangor Daily News	George H. W. Bush	November 5	Bangor	Maine	Daily	Ronald Reagan		
Battle Creek Enquirer	George H. W. Bush	October 30	Battle Creek	Michigan	Daily	Ronald Reagan		
Beatrice Daily Sun	George H. W. Bush	October 25	Beatrice	Nebraska	Daily	Ronald Reagan		
Beaumont Enterprise	George H. W. Bush	October 30	Beaumont	Texas	Daily	Ronald Reagan		
The Bellingham Herald	Michael Dukakis	October 30	Bellingham	Washington	Daily	Walter Mondale		
Billings Gazette	George H. W. Bush	October 26	Billings	Montana	Daily	Unknown		
The Birmingham News	George H. W. Bush	November 6	Birmingham	Alabama	Daily	Ronald Reagan		
Birmingham Post-Herald	George H. W. Bush	October 17	Birmingham	Alabama	Daily	Ronald Reagan		
The Blade	George H. W. Bush	October 30	Toledo	Ohio	Daily	Ronald Reagan		
The Bradenton Herald	George H. W. Bush	October 30	Bradenton	Florida	Daily	Ronald Reagan		
Bridgeton Evening News	None	October 28	Bridgeton	New Jersey	Daily	Unknown		
Bryan-College Station Eagle	George H. W. Bush	October 30	Bryan	Texas	Daily	Walter Mondale		
The Buffalo News	Michael Dukakis	October 30	Buffalo	New York	Daily	Walter Mondale		
The Burlington Free Press	Michael Dukakis	October 23	Burlington	Vermont	Daily	Ronald Reagan		
Centre Daily Times	Michael Dukakis	November 6	State College	Pennsylvania	Daily	Walter Mondale		
The Charlotte Observer	Michael Dukakis	October 23	Charlotte	North Carolina	Daily	Walter Mondale		
Chicago Tribune	Michael Dukakis	October 30	Chicago	Illinois	Daily	Ronald Reagan		
The Cincinnati Enquirer	George H. W. Bush	October 16	Cincinnati	Ohio	Daily	Ronald Reagan		
The Cincinnati Post	George H. W. Bush	October 17	Cincinnati	Ohio	Daily	Ronald Reagan		
The Clarion-Ledger and Jackson Daily News	George H. W. Bush	November 1	Jackson	Mississippi	Daily	Ronald Reagan		
The Clarksdale Press Register	George H. W. Bush	October 26	Clarksdale	Mississippi	Daily	Ronald Reagan		
Clearwater Sun	George H. W. Bush	October 30	Clearwater	Florida	Daily	Ronald Reagan		
The Columbian	Michael Dukakis	October 30	Vancouver	Washington	Daily	Walter Mondale		
The Commercial Appeal	George H. W. Bush	October 16	Memphis	Tennessee	Daily	Ronald Reagan		
Courier-Post	George H. W. Bush	October 30	Cherry Hill	New Jersey	Daily	Ronald Reagan		
The Day	Michael Dukakis	October 30	New London	Connecticut	Daily	Walter Mondale		
The Daily News	George H. W. Bush	October 9	Bowling Green	Kentucky	Daily	Ronald Reagan		
Daily News	George H. W. Bush	October 23	New York City	New York	Daily	Ronald Reagan		
The Daily Texan	Michael Dukakis	October 27	Austin	Texas	Daily	Walter Mondale		
Dayton Daily News	Michael Dukakis	October 23	Dayton	Ohio	Daily	Walter Mondale		
Detroit Free Press	Michael Dukakis	November 6	Detroit	Michigan	Daily	Walter Mondale		
The Duluth News-Tribune	George H. W. Bush	November 6	Duluth	Minnesota	Daily	Walter Mondale		
East Oregonian	Michael Dukakis	November 4	Pendleton	Oregon	Daily	Walter Mondale		
Edwardsville Intelligencer	Michael Dukakis	October 29	Edwardsville	Illinois	Daily	Ronald Reagan		
El Paso Herald-Post	George H. W. Bush	November 1	El Paso	Texas	Daily	Ronald Reagan		
El Paso Times	George H. W. Bush	November 6	El Paso	Texas	Daily	Ronald Reagan		
The Elkhart Truth	George H. W. Bush	November 6	Elkhart	Indiana	Daily	Ronald Reagan		
Express-News	George H. W. Bush	October 30	San Antonio	Texas	Daily	Ronald Reagan		
The Flint Journal	Michael Dukakis	October 30	Flint	Michigan	Daily	Ronald Reagan		
The Florida Times-Union	George H. W. Bush	October 30	Jacksonville	Florida	Daily	Ronald Reagan		
Florida Today	George H. W. Bush	October 23	Melbourne	Florida	Daily	George H. W. Bush		
Fort Worth Star-Telegram	George H. W. Bush	October 23	Fort Worth	Texas	Daily	Ronald Reagan		
The Forum	George H. W. Bush	November 1	Fargo	North Dakota	Daily	Ronald Reagan		
The Gazette	George H. W. Bush	October 30	Cedar Rapids	Iowa	Daily	Ronald Reagan		
Grand Forks Herald	Michael Dukakis	October 30	Grand Forks	North Dakota	Daily	Walter Mondale		
Grand Haven Tribune	George H. W. Bush	November 1	Grand Haven	Michigan	Daily	Ronald Reagan		
The Grand Rapids Press	George H. W. Bush	November 3	Grand Rapids	Michigan	Daily	Ronald Reagan		
Green Bay Press-Gazette	Michael Dukakis	October 23	Green Bay	Wisconsin	Daily	Unknown		
Greensboro News & Record	Michael Dukakis	October 30	Greensboro	North Carolina	Daily	Walter Mondale		
The Greenville News	George H. W. Bush	October 30	Greenville	South Carolina	Daily	Ronald Reagan		
The Greenwood Commonwealth	Michael Dukakis	November 6	Greenwood	Mississippi	Daily	Walter Mondale		
The Hartford Courant	George H. W. Bush	November 1	Hartford	Connecticut	Daily	Ronald Reagan		
The Herald	George H. W. Bush	November 6	Everett	Washington	Daily	None		
The Herald-Telephone	George H. W. Bush	October 30	Bloomington	Indiana	Daily	Ronald Reagan		
The High Point Enterprise	George H. W. Bush	November 6	High Point	North Carolina	Daily	Ronald Reagan		
The Honolulu Advertiser	None	November 6	Honolulu	Hawaii	Daily	Ronald Reagan		
Honolulu Star-Bulletin	Michael Dukakis	November 2	Honolulu	Hawaii	Daily	Ronald Reagan		
Houston Chronicle	George H. W. Bush	October 23	Houston	Texas	Daily	Ronald Reagan		
The Houston Post	George H. W. Bush	October 23	Houston	Texas	Daily	Ronald Reagan		
The Idaho Statesman	George H. W. Bush	November 6	Boise	Idaho	Daily	Ronald Reagan		
Intelligencer Journal	Michael Dukakis	November 1	Lancaster	Pennsylvania	Daily	Walter Mondale		
Iowa City Press-Citizen	Michael Dukakis	November 2	Iowa City	Iowa	Daily	Ronald Reagan		
The Jersey Journal and Jersey Observer	Michael Dukakis	November 3	Jersey City	New Jersey	Daily	Walter Mondale		
Johnson City Press	George H. W. Bush	October 23	Johnson City	Tennessee	Daily	Ronald Reagan		
Journal Star	Michael Dukakis	November 1	Peoria	Illinois	Daily	None		
The Journal Times	George H. W. Bush	November 6	Racine	Wisconsin	Daily	None (Note: Although The Journal Times did not endorse made an official endorsement, the editorial board voted Regan for his "leadership capabilities and the result of his economic policies" and Mondale for his "policies regarding military spending, health/education/welfare, and foreign relations.")		
Juneau Empire	George H. W. Bush	November 1	Juneau	Alaska	Daily	Ronald Reagan		
Kalamazoo Gazette	Michael Dukakis	October 30	Kalamazoo	Michigan	Daily	Walter Mondale		
The Kansas City Times	Michael Dukakis	October 29	Kansas City	Missouri	Daily	Ronald Reagan		
The Kansas City Star	Michael Dukakis	November 7	Kansas City	Missouri	Daily	Ronald Reagan		
Kennebec Journal	Michael Dukakis	October 31	Augusta	Maine	Daily	Ronald Reagan		
Kentucky New Era	George H. W. Bush	November 2	Hopkinsville	Kentucky	Daily	Ronald Reagan		
Kingsport Times-News	George H. W. Bush	October 23	Kingsport	Tennessee	Daily	Ronald Reagan		
The Knoxville News-Sentinel	George H. W. Bush	October 16	Knoxville	Tennessee	Daily	Ronald Reagan		
La Crosse Tribune	George H. W. Bush	October 30	La Crosse	Wisconsin	Daily	Ronald Reagan		
The Leader	George H. W. Bush	October 28	Corning	New York	Daily	Ronald Reagan		
Leader-Telegram	George H. W. Bush	November 1	Eau Claire	Wisconsin	Daily	Unknown		
The Ledger	George H. W. Bush	October 23	Lakeland	Florida	Daily	None		
Lexington Herald-Leader	Michael Dukakis	October 30	Lexington	Kentucky	Daily	Ronald Reagan		
Longview News-Journal	George H. W. Bush	October 30	Longview	Texas	Daily	Ronald Reagan		
Los Angeles Herald Examiner	George H. W. Bush	November 6	Los Angeles	California	Daily	Ronald Reagan		
Lake Charles American Press	George H. W. Bush	November 6	Lake Charles	Louisiana	Daily	Walter Mondale		
The Miami Herald	George H. W. Bush	October 30	Miami	Florida	Daily	Ronald Reagan		
The Miami News	Michael Dukakis	November 7	Miami	Florida	Daily	Walter Mondale		
Midland Daily News	George H. W. Bush	October 31	Midland	Michigan	Daily	Ronald Reagan		
Midland Reporter-Telegram	George H. W. Bush	October 9	Midland	Texas	Daily	Ronald Reagan		
The Mining Journal	Michael Dukakis	November 6	Marquette	Michigan	Daily	Ronald Reagan		
Missoulian	George H. W. Bush	November 6	Missoula	Montana	Daily	Ronald Reagan		
The Montgomery Advertiser and The Alabama Journal	George H. W. Bush	October 23	Montgomery	Alabama	Daily	Unknown		
The Morning News and Evening Journal	Michael Dukakis	November 6	Wilmington	Delaware	Daily	Walter Mondale		
The Muskegon Chronicle	George H. W. Bush	October 23	Muskegon	Michigan	Daily	Ronald Reagan		
The New York Times	Michael Dukakis	October 30	New York City	New York	Daily	Walter Mondale		
The News & Daily Advance	George H. W. Bush	October 30	Lynchburg	Virginia	Daily	Ronald Reagan		
The News and Observer	Michael Dukakis	October 23	Raleigh	North Carolina	Daily	Walter Mondale		
News Journal	George H. W. Bush	October 23	Mansfield	Ohio	Daily	Ronald Reagan		
The News-Journal	Michael Dukakis	November 6	Daytona Beach	Florida	Daily	Walter Mondale (Note: Until 1986, both papers maintained separate editiorial staff.)		
News-Press	George H. W. Bush	October 30	Fort Myers	Florida	Daily	Walter Mondale		
The News-Star	George H. W. Bush	October 30	Monroe	Louisiana	Daily	Ronald Reagan		
The News-Times	Michael Dukakis	November 6	Danbury	Connecticut	Daily	Walter Mondale		
Newsday	Michael Dukakis	October 30	Melville	New York	Daily	None (Note: Newsday did not make any endorsements for president since 1972.)		
Norwich Bulletin	George H. W. Bush	November 6	Norwich	Connecticut	Daily	Ronald Reagan		
The Odessa American	None	November 6	Odessa	Texas	Daily	None		
Omaha World-Herald	George H. W. Bush	October 24	Omaha	Nebraska	Daily	Ronald Reagan		
The Oregonian	George H. W. Bush	October 30	Portland	Oregon	Daily	Ronald Reagan		
Palladium-Item	George H. W. Bush	November 6	Richmond	Indiana	Daily	Ronald Reagan		
The Patriot and The Evening News	George H. W. Bush	October 30	Harrisburg	Pennsylvania	Daily	Ronald Reagan		
Philadelphia Daily News	Michael Dukakis	October 28	Philadelphia	Pennsylvania	Daily	Walter Mondale		
The Philadelphia Inquirer	Michael Dukakis	October 30	Philadelphia	Pennsylvania	Daily	Walter Mondale		
Pittsburgh Post-Gazette	Michael Dukakis	October 21	Pittsburgh	Pennsylvania	Daily	Walter Mondale		
The Pittsburgh Press	George H. W. Bush	October 16	Pittsburgh	Pennsylvania	Daily	Ronald Reagan		
The Plain Dealer	George H. W. Bush	October 23	Cleveland	Ohio	Daily	Ronald Reagan		
Portland Press Herald	George H. W. Bush	October 31	Portland	Maine	Daily	Ronald Reagan		
Post-Bulletin	Michael Dukakis	November 4	Rochester	Minnesota	Daily	None (Note: Although the Post-Bulletin didn't directly endorse any candidate, its editorial board supports Mondale saying that, "he has the temperament and the intellect to work at the job himself.")		
Poughkeepsie Journal	George H. W. Bush	October 30	Poughkeepsie	New York	Daily	Ronald Reagan		
The Press	None	November 6	Atlantic City	New Jersey	Daily	Walter Mondale		
Quad-City Times	George H. W. Bush	October 30	Davenport	Iowa	Daily	Ronald Reagan		
The Quincy Herald-Whig	George H. W. Bush	October 30	Quincy	Illinois	Daily	Ronald Reagan		
Rapid City Journal	Michael Dukakis	November 6	Rapid City	South Dakota	Daily	Ronald Reagan		
The Record	George H. W. Bush	October 30	Hackensack	New Jersey	Daily	Walter Mondale		
Record-Journal	None	October 28	Meriden	Connecticut	Daily	Walter Mondale		
The Register-Guard	Michael Dukakis	November 6	Eugene	Oregon	Daily	Ronald Reagan		
Richmond Times-Dispatch	George H. W. Bush	October 23	Richmond	Virginia	Daily	Ronald Reagan		
Roanoke Times & World-News	Michael Dukakis	October 30	Roanoke	Virginia	Daily	Walter Mondale		
The Rock Island Argus	George H. W. Bush	November 6	Rock Island	Illinois	Daily	Ronald Reagan		
Rocky Mountain News	George H. W. Bush	October 16	Denver	Colorado	Daily	Ronald Reagan		
Rockford Register Star	Michael Dukakis	October 30	Rockford	Illinois	Daily	Walter Mondale		
Scrantonian Tribune	None	October 30	Scranton	Pennsylvania	Daily	Ronald Reagan		
The Scranton Times and The Morning Times	Michael Dukakis	October 30	Scranton	Pennsylvania	Daily	Ronald Reagan		
The Sacramento Bee	Michael Dukakis	October 23	Sacramento	California	Daily	Walter Mondale		
The Sacramento Union	George H. W. Bush	October 9	Sacramento	California	Daily	Ronald Reagan		
The Saginaw News	George H. W. Bush	October 30	Saginaw	Michigan	Daily	Ronald Reagan		
San Antonio Light	George H. W. Bush	October 30	San Antonio	Texas	Daily	Ronald Reagan		
San Francisco Chronicle	George H. W. Bush	November 1	San Francisco	California	Daily	Ronald Reagan		
San Francisco Examiner	George H. W. Bush	October 30	San Francisco	California	Daily	Ronald Reagan		
Santa Barbara News-Press	George H. W. Bush	October 30	Santa Barbara	California	Daily	Ronald Reagan		
Sarasota Herald-Tribune	George H. W. Bush	October 30	Sarasota	Florida	Daily	Ronald Reagan		
The Sheboygan Press	George H. W. Bush	October 30	Sheboygan	Wisconsin	Daily	Walter Mondale		
Shreveport Journal	Michael Dukakis	October 28	Shreveport	Louisiana	Daily	None		
South Bend Tribune	Michael Dukakis	November 6	South Bend	Indiana	Daily	Walter Mondale		
Southern Illinoisan	Michael Dukakis	October 23	Carbondale	Illinois	Daily	Ronald Reagan		
Southwest Times Record	George H. W. Bush	October 13	Fort Smith	Arkansas	Daily	Ronald Reagan		
The Spokesman-Review and Spokane Chronicle (Note: Both papers are separate but they share the same editorial board.)	George H. W. Bush	October 10	Spokane	Washington	Daily	Ronald Reagan		
The Springfield News-Leader	George H. W. Bush	November 1	Springfield	Missouri	Daily	Ronald Reagan (Note: Until 1987, Both papers are separate but they share the same editorial board (with the exception of the editorial page editor).)		
Springfield Union-News	George H. W. Bush	October 18	Springfield	Massachusetts	Daily	Split (Note: The Springfield Daily News made endorsements for Walter Mondale and The Morning Union made endorsements for Ronald Reagan.) (Note: Until 1987, both papers maintained separate editiorial staff.)		
St. Joseph News-Press	George H. W. Bush	November 6	St. Joseph	Missouri	Daily	Ronald Reagan (Note: Until 1986, Both papers are separate but they share the same editorial board (with the exception of the editorial page editor).)		
St. Louis Post-Dispatch	Michael Dukakis	November 6	St. Louis	Missouri	Daily	Walter Mondale		
St. Petersburg Times	Michael Dukakis	October 28	St. Petersburg	Florida	Daily	Walter Mondale		
Standard-Speaker	George H. W. Bush	October 28	Hazleton	Pennsylvania	Daily	Unknown		
Star Tribune	Michael Dukakis	October 30	Minneapolis	Minnesota	Daily	Walter Mondale		
The State	George H. W. Bush	October 30	Columbia	South Carolina	Daily	Ronald Reagan		
The State Journal-Register	George H. W. Bush	October 31	Springfield	Illinois	Daily	Ronald Reagan		
The Sun	None	November 6	Baltimore	Maryland	Daily	None		
The Sun News	George H. W. Bush	October 30	Myrtle Beach	South Carolina	Daily	Ronald Reagan		
Tallahassee Democrat	Michael Dukakis	October 30	Tallahassee	Florida	Daily	Walter Mondale		
The Tennessean	Michael Dukakis	November 1	Nashville	Tennessee	Daily	Walter Mondale		
The Times	George H. W. Bush	October 27	Gainesville	Georgia	Daily	Ronald Reagan		
The Times	George H. W. Bush	November 6	Shreveport	Louisiana	Daily	Ronald Reagan		
The Times	George H. W. Bush	October 30	Trenton	New Jersey	Daily	Ronald Reagan		
Times Herald	George H. W. Bush	November 6	Port Huron	Michigan	Daily	Ronald Reagan		
The Times Leader	George H. W. Bush	November 6	Wilkes-Barre	Pennsylvania	Daily	Ronald Reagan		
The Times-Mail	George H. W. Bush	October 28	Bedford	Indiana	Daily	Unknown		
Transcript-Telegram	Michael Dukakis	November 4	Holyoke	Massachusetts	Daily	Walter Mondale		
Tri-City Herald	George H. W. Bush	October 23	Pasco	Washington	Daily	Ronald Reagan		
Troy Daily News	George H. W. Bush	October 30	Troy	Ohio	Daily	Ronald Reagan		
Tulsa World	George H. W. Bush	October 16	Tulsa	Oklahoma	Daily	Ronald Reagan		
The Victoria Advocate	George H. W. Bush	October 30	Victoria	Texas	Daily	Unknown		
Waterloo Courier	None	November 6	Waterloo	Iowa	Daily	Walter Mondale		
The Wichita Eagle-Beacon	Michael Dukakis	October 30	Wichita	Kansas	Daily	Ronald Reagan		
Wilmington Morning Star	George H. W. Bush	November 3	Wilmington	North Carolina	Daily	Ronald Reagan		
Winston-Salem Journal	George H. W. Bush	November 7	Winston-Salem	North Carolina	Daily	Walter Mondale		
Wisconsin State Journal	George H. W. Bush	October 30	Madison	Wisconsin	Daily	Ronald Reagan		
Worcester Telegram and The Evening Gazette	George H. W. Bush	October 23	Worcester	Massachusetts	Daily	Ronald Reagan		

== See also ==
- 1988 United States presidential election
- George H. W. Bush 1988 presidential campaign
- Michael Dukakis 1988 presidential campaign
