= Newspaper endorsements in the 1980 United States presidential election =

The following table is the list of newspaper endorsements in the 1980 United States presidential election. It mostly contains major and small city newspapers of 1980, which made their presidential endorsement from September–November 1980.

== List ==
Newspaper	1980 endorsement	Endorsement date	City	State	Type	1976 endorsement	Reference(s)	
Newspaper	1980 endorsement	Endorsement date	City	State	Type	1976 endorsement	1980	1976
Abilene Reporter-News	Ronald Reagan	October 26	Abilene	Texas	Daily	Unknown		
The Advocate	Jimmy Carter	November 1	Stamford	Connecticut	Daily	Unknown		
Akron Beacon Journal	Jimmy Carter	October 26	Akron	Ohio	Daily	Jimmy Carter		
Albert Lea Tribune	Ronald Reagan	October 28	Albert Lea	Minnesota	Daily	Gerald Ford		
Albuquerque Journal	Ronald Reagan	October 26	Albuquerque	New Mexico	Daily	Gerald Ford		
The Albuquerque Tribune (Note: The E.W. Scripps Company has endorsed the candidate on behalf of the paper.)	Ronald Reagan	October 6	Albuquerque	New Mexico	Daily	Gerald Ford		
Anchorage Daily News	Jimmy Carter	October 30	Anchorage	Alaska	Daily	Gerald Ford		
The Anniston Star	Jimmy Carter	October 22	Anniston	Alabama	Daily	Jimmy Carter		
The Arizona Republic	Ronald Reagan	October 9	Phoenix	Arizona	Daily	Gerald Ford		
Asbury Park Press	Ronald Reagan	October 26	Asbury Park	New Jersey	Daily	Unknown		
The Atlanta Constitution	Jimmy Carter	October 7	Atlanta	Georgia	Daily	Jimmy Carter		
The Atlanta Journal	Jimmy Carter	October 27	Atlanta	Georgia	Daily	Jimmy Carter		
Austin American-Statesman	Jimmy Carter	October 19	Austin	Texas	Daily	Jimmy Carter		
Bangor Daily News	Ronald Reagan	November 1	Bangor	Maine	Daily	Gerald Ford		
The Bay City Times	Ronald Reagan	October 26	Bay City	Michigan	Daily	Jimmy Carter		
Beaumont Enterprise	None	November 2	Beaumont	Texas	Daily	Gerald Ford		
The Belleville Times	Ronald Reagan	October 30	Belleville	New Jersey	Weekly	Unknown		
The Birmingham News	Ronald Reagan	November 2	Birmingham	Alabama	Daily	Gerald Ford		
Birmingham Post-Herald	Ronald Reagan	October 6	Birmingham	Alabama	Daily	Gerald Ford		
The Blade	Ronald Reagan	November 2	Toledo	Ohio	Daily	Jimmy Carter		
The Boston Globe	Split (Note: The Boston Globe made endorsements for both John B. Anderson and Jimmy Carter.)	October 30	Boston	Massachusetts	Daily	Jimmy Carter		
Boston Herald American	Ronald Reagan	-	Boston	Massachusetts	Daily	Gerald Ford		
The Broken Arrow Daily Ledger	Ronald Reagan	October 30	Broken Arrow	Oklahoma	Daily	Unknown		
Buffalo Evening News	Jimmy Carter	October 24	Buffalo	New York	Daily	Gerald Ford		
The Bulletin	John B. Anderson	October 30	Bend	Oregon	Daily	Unknown		
The Capital Times	Jimmy Carter	November 3	Madison	Wisconsin	Daily	Jimmy Carter		
The Charlotte Observer	Jimmy Carter	November 2	Charlotte	North Carolina	Daily	Unknown		
Citrus County Chronicle	Ronald Reagan	October 31	Inverness	Florida	Daily	Unknown		
Clearwater Sun	Ronald Reagan	October 26	Clearwater	Florida	Daily	None		
The Cleveland Press	Ronald Reagan	October 6-8	Cleveland	Ohio	Daily	Gerald Ford		
The Columbian	Jimmy Carter	October 26	Vancouver	Washington	Daily	Gerald Ford		
The Commercial Appeal	Ronald Reagan	November 2	Memphis	Tennessee	Daily	Gerald Ford		
Concord Monitor	Split (Note: The Concord Monitor made endorsements for both John B. Anderson (out of protest) and Jimmy Carter (if backed into a wall).)	October 30	Concord	New Hampshire	Daily	None		
The Courier-Journal	Jimmy Carter	October 19	Louisville	Kentucky	Daily	Jimmy Carter		
Courier-Post	Jimmy Carter	October 26	Cherry Hill	New Jersey	Daily	Jimmy Carter		
Chronicle-Tribune	Ronald Reagan	November 2	Marion	Indiana	Daily	Gerald Ford		
The Daily Item	None	October 31	Lynn	Massachusetts	Daily	None		
The Daily Item	Ronald Reagan	October 27	Sunbury	Pennsylvania	Daily	Gerald Ford		
The Daily News	Ronald Reagan	October 26	Bowling Green	Kentucky	Daily	Gerald Ford		
The Daily News	Ronald Reagan	October 21	Port Angeles	Washington	Daily	Gerald Ford		
Daily News	Ronald Reagan	October 31	New York City	New York	Daily	Gerald Ford		
The Daily Nonpareil	Ronald Reagan	November 2	Council Bluffs	Iowa	Daily	Gerald Ford		
The Daily Pantagraph	Ronald Reagan	October 24	Bloomington	Illinois	Daily	Gerald Ford		
The Daily Sentinel	Ronald Reagan	October 19	Grand Junction	Colorado	Daily	Gerald Ford		
Daily Star	Ronald Reagan	October 31	Hammond	Louisiana	Daily	Unknown		
The Dallas Morning News	Ronald Reagan	September 21	Dallas	Texas	Daily	Gerald Ford		
Dayton Daily News	Jimmy Carter	October 5	Dayton	Ohio	Daily	Jimmy Carter		
Democrat and Chronicle	None	October 20	Rochester	New York	Daily	Gerald Ford		
The Des Moines Register	Jimmy Carter	October 26	Des Moines	Iowa	Daily	Jimmy Carter		
Detroit Free Press	Jimmy Carter	November 2	Detroit	Michigan	Daily	Jimmy Carter		
The Dothan Eagle	Ronald Reagan	October 31	Dothan	Alabama	Daily	Gerald Ford		
East Oregonian	John B. Anderson	October 21	Pendleton	Oregon	Daily	None		
El Paso Herald-Post	Ronald Reagan	October 6	El Paso	Texas	Daily	Gerald Ford		
The El Paso Times	Ronald Reagan	October 19	El Paso	Texas	Daily	Gerald Ford		
The Elkhart Truth	Ronald Reagan	October 31	Elkhart	Indiana	Daily	Gerald Ford		
The Evansville Courier	Ronald Reagan (Note: The Courier's editorial board voted almost unanimously to not endorse anyone despite endorsing Reagan.)	October 6	Evansville	Indiana	Daily	Unknown		
The Evansville Press	Ronald Reagan	October 6	Evansville	Indiana	Daily	Gerald Ford		
The Evening Press	John B. Anderson	September 8	Binghamton	New York	Daily	None		
Enquirer and News	Ronald Reagan	October 26	Battle Creek	Michigan	Daily	Gerald Ford		
Eugene Register-Guard	Ronald Reagan	November 2	Eugene	Oregon	Daily	Gerald Ford		
The Flint Journal	Ronald Reagan	October 30	Flint	Michigan	Daily	Gerald Ford		
Florence Morning News	Ronald Reagan (Note: The Florence Morning News did not directly endorse Reagan but the paper predicts that he will be president.)	November 1	Florence	South Carolina	Daily	None		
Fort Lauderdale News and Sun-Sentinel	Jimmy Carter	October 26	Fort Lauderdale	Florida	Daily	Gerald Ford		
The Florida Times-Union and Jacksonville Journal	Ronald Reagan	October 26	Jacksonville	Florida	Daily	Gerald Ford		
Fort Worth Star-Telegram	Ronald Reagan	October 26	Fort Worth	Texas	Daily	Gerald Ford		
The Forum	Ronald Reagan	November 2	Fargo	North Dakota	Daily	Gerald Ford		
The Gazette	Ronald Reagan	October 26	Cedar Rapids	Iowa	Daily	Gerald Ford		
Grand Forks Herald	Jimmy Carter	October 19	Grand Forks	North Dakota	Daily	Gerald Ford		
Grand Haven Tribune	Ronald Reagan	October 28	Grand Haven	Michigan	Daily	Unknown		
The Grand Island Daily Independent	Ronald Reagan	October 12	Grand Island	Nebraska	Daily	Gerald Ford		
The Grand Rapids Press	Ronald Reagan	October 31	Grand Rapids	Michigan	Daily	Gerald Ford		
Greensboro Daily News	Jimmy Carter	November 2	Greensboro	North Carolina	Daily	Jimmy Carter		
The Greensboro Record	Ronald Reagan	October 30	Greensboro	North Carolina	Daily	Gerald Ford		
The Hartford Courant	John B. Anderson	November 2	Hartford	Connecticut	Daily	Gerald Ford		
The Herald-Telephone	Ronald Reagan	October 28	Bloomington	Indiana	Daily	Gerald Ford		
The High Point Enterprise	Jimmy Carter	November 2	High Point	North Carolina	Daily	Gerald Ford		
Houston Chronicle	Ronald Reagan	November 2	Houston	Texas	Daily	Gerald Ford		
The Idaho Statesman	Ronald Reagan	November 2	Boise	Idaho	Daily	Gerald Ford		
Intelligencer Journal	Jimmy Carter	October 31	Lancaster	Pennsylvania	Daily	Jimmy Carter		
The Jersey Journal and Jersey Observer	Ronald Reagan	October 31	Jersey City	New Jersey	Daily	Jimmy Carter		
Johnson City Press-Chronicle	Ronald Reagan	November 2	Johnson City	Tennessee	Daily	Gerald Ford		
Journal Star	Ed Clark	October 26	Peoria	Illinois	Daily	Jimmy Carter		
The Journal Times	Ronald Reagan	October 30	Racine	Wisconsin	Daily	Gerald Ford		
Juneau Empire	Ronald Reagan	October 31	Juneau	Alaska	Daily	Gerald Ford		
Kalamazoo Gazette	Jimmy Carter	November 2	Kalamazoo	Michigan	Daily	Jimmy Carter		
The Kansas City Star	Jimmy Carter	October 26	Kansas City	Missouri	Daily	Unknown		
La Crosse Tribune	Ronald Reagan	October 30	La Crosse	Wisconsin	Daily	None		
Las Cruces Sun-News	Ronald Reagan	October 30	Las Cruces	New Mexico	Daily	Gerald Ford		
Las Vegas Review-Journal	Ronald Reagan	October 26	Las Vegas	Nevada	Daily	Unknown		
Lexington Herald	Ronald Reagan	October 30	Lexington	Kentucky	Daily	Jimmy Carter		
The Lexington Leader	Ronald Reagan	October 24	Lexington	Kentucky	Daily	Gerald Ford		
Lincoln Journal	None	October 30	Lincoln	Nebraska	Daily	Gerald Ford		
The Lincoln Star	Jimmy Carter	October 30	Lincoln	Nebraska	Daily	Jimmy Carter		
Los Angeles Herald Examiner	None (Note: Although the Herald Examiner didn't directly endorse any candidate, its editorial board supports Reagan.)	October 15-17	Los Angeles	California	Daily	Gerald Ford		
Los Angeles Times	None	October 30 (Note: The Los Angeles Times does not make endorsements for president as of 1973.)	Los Angeles	California	Daily	None		
Messenger-Inquirer	Ronald Reagan	October 26	Owensboro	Kentucky	Daily	None		
Marshfield News-Herald	Ronald Reagan	October 30	Marshfield	Wisconsin	Daily	Unknown		
McKinney Courier-Gazette	Ronald Reagan	October 19	McKinney	Texas	Daily	Unknown		
Memphis Press-Scimitar	Ronald Reagan	October 6	Memphis	Tennessee	Daily	Gerald Ford		
The Miami Herald	John B. Anderson	October 19	Miami	Florida	Daily	Gerald Ford		
The Miami News	John B. Anderson	October 30	Miami	Florida	Daily	Jimmy Carter		
Midland Daily News	None	October 31	Midland	Michigan	Daily	None		
The Midland Reporter-Telegram	Ronald Reagan	October 12	Midland	Texas	Daily	Gerald Ford		
The Mining Journal	Ronald Reagan	October 31	Marquette	Michigan	Daily	Gerald Ford		
Minneapolis Tribune	Jimmy Carter	October 26	Minneapolis	Minnesota	Daily	Jimmy Carter		
Monterey Peninsula Herald	Ronald Reagan	November 2	Monterey	California	Daily	Jimmy Carter		
The Morning Herald & Review	Ronald Reagan	October 31	Decatur	Illinois	Daily	Jimmy Carter		
The Monroe Evening News	Jimmy Carter	October 31	Monroe	Michigan	Daily	Gerald Ford		
The Muncie Evening Press	Ronald Reagan	October 29	Muncie	Indiana	Daily	Unknown		
The Muskegon Chronicle	Ronald Reagan	October 29	Muskegon	Michigan	Daily	Gerald Ford		
The New Mexican	Ronald Reagan	November 2	Santa Fe	New Mexico	Daily	Jimmy Carter		
The New York Times	Jimmy Carter	October 26	New York City	New York	Daily	Jimmy Carter		
The News & Daily Advance	Ronald Reagan	October 26	Lynchburg	Virginia	Daily	Unknown		
News-Democrat	Ronald Reagan	October 26	Belleville	Illinois	Daily	Split (Note: The News-Democrat's editorial board could not agree on whether to pick Ford or Carter and decided to write their separate views on picking a president.)		
News-Tribune and Herald	Jimmy Carter	November 2	Duluth	Minnesota	Daily	Gerald Ford		
The News-Virginian	Ronald Reagan	October 30	Waynesboro	Virginia	Daily	Unknown		
The Oklahoman	Ronald Reagan	October 30	Oklahoma City	Oklahoma	Daily	Gerald Ford		
Omaha World-Herald	Ronald Reagan	October 31	Omaha	Nebraska	Daily	Gerald Ford		
The Oregonian	Ronald Reagan	October 26	Portland	Oregon	Daily	Gerald Ford		
Oregon Labor Press	Jimmy Carter	October 31	Portland	Oregon	Weekly	Jimmy Carter		
The Orlando Sentinel	None	November 2	Orlando	Florida	Daily	Gerald Ford		
The Patriot and The Evening News	None	November 2	Harrisburg	Pennsylvania	Daily	Gerald Ford		
Petoskey News-Review	None (Note: The Petoskey News-Review endorsed George H. W. Bush for vice president but did not endorse any presidential candidate.)	October 31	Petoskey	Michigan	Daily	Unknown		
Philadelphia Daily News	Jimmy Carter	October 29	Philadelphia	Pennsylvania	Daily	Jimmy Carter		
The Philadelphia Inquirer	Jimmy Carter	November 2	Philadelphia	Pennsylvania	Daily	Gerald Ford		
Pittsburgh Post-Gazette	Jimmy Carter	October 27	Pittsburgh	Pennsylvania	Daily	Jimmy Carter		
The Pittsburgh Press	Ronald Reagan	October 6	Pittsburgh	Pennsylvania	Daily	Gerald Ford		
The Plain Dealer	Ronald Reagan	October 19	Cleveland	Ohio	Daily	Gerald Ford		
Portland Press Herald	Jimmy Carter	October 27	Portland	Maine	Daily	Gerald Ford		
The Press	None	November 2	Atlantic City	New Jersey	Daily	None		
Quad-City Times	Ronald Reagan	October 26	Davenport	Iowa	Daily	Gerald Ford		
The Quincy Herald-Whig	Ronald Reagan	October 29	Quincy	Illinois	Daily	Gerald Ford		
Rapid City Journal	Ronald Reagan	October 27	Rapid City	South Dakota	Daily	Gerald Ford		
Ravalli Republic	John B. Anderson	October 29	Hamilton	Montana	Daily	Unknown		
The Record	Jimmy Carter	October 26	Hackensack	New Jersey	Daily	Jimmy Carter		
Record-Journal	None	October 20	Meriden	Connecticut	Daily	Split (Note: The Journal made endorsements for Jimmy Carter and The Morning Record made endorsements for Gerald Ford.) (Note: Until 1977, both papers maintained separate editiorial staff.)		
Richmond Times-Dispatch	Ronald Reagan	November 2	Richmond	Virginia	Daily	Gerald Ford		
Rochester Post-Bulletin	Ronald Reagan	October 28	Rochester	Minnesota	Daily	Gerald Ford		
Rockford Register Star	John B. Anderson	October 26	Rockford	Illinois	Daily	Gerald Ford		
Rocky Mountain News	Ronald Reagan	October 6	Denver	Colorado	Daily	Gerald Ford		
Rutland Daily Herald	Jimmy Carter	October 23	Rutland	Vermont	Daily	Unknown		
The Sacramento Bee	Jimmy Carter	October 9	Sacramento	California	Daily	Jimmy Carter		
The Sacramento Union	Ronald Reagan	October 21	Sacramento	California	Daily	Gerald Ford		
San Angelo Standard-Times (Note: Both papers are separate but they share the same editorial board.)	Ronald Reagan	October 31	San Angelo	Texas	Daily	Gerald Ford		
San Antonio Express and The News	Ronald Reagan	November 2	San Antonio	Texas	Daily	Jimmy Carter		
San Antonio Light	Ronald Reagan	November 2	San Antonio	Texas	Daily	Gerald Ford		
San Francisco Chronicle	Ronald Reagan	October 31	San Francisco	California	Daily	Gerald Ford		
San Francisco Examiner	Ronald Reagan	October 26	San Francisco	California	Daily	Gerald Ford		
Sandpoint Daily Bee	Jimmy Carter	October 31	Sandpoint	Idaho	Daily	Unknown		
Santa Barbara News-Press	Ronald Reagan	October 28	Santa Barbara	California	Daily	None		
Santa Cruz Sentinel	Ronald Reagan	October 12	Santa Cruz	California	Daily	Gerald Ford		
Santa Maria Times	Ronald Reagan	October 31	Santa Maria	California	Daily	Gerald Ford		
Sarasota Herald-Tribune	Ronald Reagan	October 26	Sarasota	Florida	Daily	Gerald Ford		
The Sentinel	Jimmy Carter	October 30	Winston-Salem	North Carolina	Daily	Jimmy Carter		
The Sheboygan Press	Jimmy Carter	October 30	Sheboygan	Wisconsin	Daily	Jimmy Carter		
The Sioux City Journal	Ronald Reagan	October 31	Sioux City	Iowa	Daily	Unknown		
South Bend Tribune	None	November 2	South Bend	Indiana	Daily	None		
Southwest Times Record	Ronald Reagan	October 18	Fort Smith	Arkansas	Daily	Gerald Ford		
The Spokesman-Review	Ronald Reagan	October 16	Spokane	Washington	Daily	Gerald Ford		
Star-Gazette	Jimmy Carter	October 28	Elmira	New York	Daily	Unknown		
Star-Herald	Ronald Reagan	October 25	Scottsbluff	Nebraska	Daily	Gerald Ford		
The State	Ronald Reagan	November 2	Columbia	South Carolina	Daily	Gerald Ford		
The State Journal-Register	Ronald Reagan	October 27	Springfield	Illinois	Daily	Gerald Ford		
Staten Island Advance	Jimmy Carter	October 26	Staten Island	New York	Daily	Gerald Ford		
St. Cloud Daily Times	Ronald Reagan	October 31	St. Cloud	Minnesota	Daily	Unknown		
St. Joseph News-Press	Ronald Reagan	October 26	St. Joseph	Missouri	Daily	Gerald Ford		
St. Louis Post-Dispatch	Jimmy Carter	October 12	St. Louis	Missouri	Daily	Unknown		
The Sun	Jimmy Carter	October 26	Baltimore	Maryland	Daily	Gerald Ford		
The Tennessean	Jimmy Carter	October 19	Nashville	Tennessee	Daily	Jimmy Carter		
Trenton Times	None	October 31	Trenton	New Jersey	Daily	Jimmy Carter		
The Times Herald	Ronald Reagan	November 2	Port Huron	Michigan	Daily	Jimmy Carter		
Times-Press	Ronald Reagan	October 15	Streator	Illinois	Daily	Unknown		
Times-Union	None	October 21	Rochester	New York	Daily	Gerald Ford		
Tulsa World	Ronald Reagan	October 30	Tulsa	Oklahoma	Daily	Jimmy Carter		
Waukesha Freeman	Ronald Reagan	October 29	Waukesha	Wisconsin	Daily	None		
West Milton Record	Ronald Reagan (Note: Bowling-Moorman Newspapers has endorsed the candidate on behalf of the paper.)	October 26	West Milton	Ohio	Daily	Unknown		
Winston-Salem Journal	Ronald Reagan	November 2	Winston-Salem	North Carolina	Daily	Gerald Ford		
Wisconsin State Journal	Ronald Reagan	October 31	Madison	Wisconsin	Daily	Gerald Ford		
Worcester Telegram and The Evening Gazette	Ronald Reagan	November 2	Worcester	Massachusetts	Daily	Unknown		

== See also ==
- 1980 United States presidential election
- Ronald Reagan 1980 presidential campaign
- Jimmy Carter 1980 presidential campaign
