= Newspaper endorsements in the 1976 United States presidential election =

The following table is the list of newspaper endorsements in the 1976 United States presidential election. It mostly contains major and small city newspapers of 1976, which made their presidential endorsement from September–November 1976. The Los Angeles Times did not make any endorsements for president until 2008, when they endorsed Barack Obama.

== Domestic newspapers ==
Newspaper	1976 endorsement	Endorsement date	City	State	Type	1972 endorsement	Reference(s)	
Newspaper	1976 endorsement	Endorsement date	City	State	Type	1972 endorsement	1976	1972
Akron Beacon Journal	Jimmy Carter	October 24	Akron	Ohio	Daily	Unknown		
Albuquerque Journal	Gerald Ford	October 24	Albuquerque	New Mexico	Daily	Richard Nixon		
The Albuquerque Tribune (Note: The E.W. Scripps Company has endorsed the candidate on behalf of the paper.)	Gerald Ford	October 26	Albuquerque	New Mexico	Daily	Richard Nixon		
The Atlanta Constitution	Jimmy Carter	November 2	Atlanta	Georgia	Daily	Richard Nixon		
The Atlanta Journal	Jimmy Carter	October 27	Atlanta	Georgia	Daily	Richard Nixon		
The Bakersfield Californian	Gerald Ford	October 24	Bakersfield	California	Daily	Unknown		
Beaumont Enterprise and Beaumont Journal	Gerald Ford	October 31	Beaumont	Texas	Daily	Unknown		
The Birmingham News	Gerald Ford	October 10	Birmingham	Alabama	Daily	Richard Nixon		
The Blade	Jimmy Carter	October 31	Toledo	Ohio	Daily	Unknown		
The Broken Arrow Ledger	Jimmy Carter	October 28	Broken Arrow	Oklahoma	Twice-weekly	Unknown		
The Capital Times	Jimmy Carter	October 28	Madison	Wisconsin	Daily	Jimmy Carter		
The Charlotte Observer	Gerald Ford	October 24	Charlotte	North Carolina	Daily	Unknown		
The Clarksdale Press Register	Gerald Ford	October 31	Clarksdale	Mississippi	Daily	Unknown		
The Cleveland Press	Gerald Ford	October 26	Cleveland	Ohio	Daily	Richard Nixon		
The Columbian	Gerald Ford	October 27	Vancouver	Washington	Daily	Richard Nixon		
The Coeur d'Alene Press	Gerald Ford	October 29	Coeur d'Alene	Idaho	Daily	Unknown		
The Daily Advertiser	Gerald Ford	October 31	Lafayette	Louisiana	Daily	Unknown		
The Daily News	Gerald Ford	October 29	Longview	Washington	Daily	Unknown		
The Daily Progress	Gerald Ford	October 24	Charlottesville	Virginia	Daily	Unknown		
The Daily Tifton Gazette	Jimmy Carter	October 26	Tifton	Georgia	Daily	Richard Nixon		
The Dallas Morning News	Gerald Ford	October 17	Dallas	Texas	Daily	Unknown		
Dayton Daily News	Jimmy Carter	October 10	Dayton	Ohio	Daily	None		
Democrat and Chronicle	Gerald Ford	October 21	Rochester	New York	Daily	Richard Nixon		
The Des Moines Register	Jimmy Carter	October 24	Des Moines	Iowa	Daily	Richard Nixon		
Detroit Free Press	Jimmy Carter	October 26	Detroit	Michigan	Daily	George McGovern		
Denton Record-Chronicle	Gerald Ford	October 28	Denton	Texas	Daily	Unknown		
Duluth News-Tribune	Gerald Ford	October 31	Duluth	Minnesota	Daily	Richard Nixon		
The Evening Tribune	Ronald Reagan	October 27	Albert Lea	Minnesota	Daily	Richard Nixon		
The Florida Times-Union and Jacksonville Journal	Gerald Ford	October 24	Jacksonville	Florida	Daily	Richard Nixon		
Fort Worth Star-Telegram	Gerald Ford	October 17	Fort Worth	Texas	Daily	Richard Nixon		
The Forum	Gerald Ford	October 28	Fargo	North Dakota	Daily	Richard Nixon		
The Gazette	Gerald Ford	October 24	Cedar Rapids	Iowa	Daily	Richard Nixon		
The Grand Island Daily Independent	Gerald Ford	October 12	Grand Island	Nebraska	Daily	Gerald Ford		
The Grand Rapids Press	Gerald Ford	October 30	Grand Rapids	Michigan	Daily	None		
Great Falls Tribune	Gerald Ford	October 24	Great Falls	Montana	Daily	Richard Nixon		
The Hartford Courant	Gerald Ford	October 31	Hartford	Connecticut	Daily	Unknown		
The Herald-Palladium	Gerald Ford	October 29	Benton Harbor-St. Joseph	Michigan	Daily	Unknown		
The Herald-Star	Gerald Ford	October 27	Steubenville	Ohio	Daily	Unknown		
The Herald-Telephone	Gerald Ford	October 26	Bloomington	Indiana	Daily	Richard Nixon		
The High Point Enterprise	Gerald Ford	October 31	High Point	North Carolina	Daily	Richard Nixon		
Houston Chronicle	Gerald Ford	October 24	Houston	Texas	Daily	Richard Nixon		
The Houston Post	Jimmy Carter	November 5	Houston	Texas	Daily	Unknown		
The Idaho Statesman	Gerald Ford	October 31	Boise	Idaho	Daily	None		
The Index	Gerald Ford	October 28	Hermitage	Missouri	Weekly	Richard Nixon		
Intelligencer Journal	Jimmy Carter	October 26	Lancaster	Pennsylvania	Daily	George McGovern		
The Jersey Journal and Jersey Observer	Jimmy Carter	October 22	Jersey City	New Jersey	Daily	Richard Nixon		
Imperial Beach Star-News	Jimmy Carter	October 14	Imperial Beach	California	Twice-weekly	George McGovern		
The Ithaca Journal	Jimmy Carter	October 25	Ithaca	New York	Daily	Richard Nixon		
Johnson City Press-Chronicle	Gerald Ford	October 28	Johnson City	Tennessee	Daily	Richard Nixon		
Journal Star	Jimmy Carter	October 28	Peoria	Illinois	Daily	Richard Nixon		
Kenosha News	Gerald Ford	October 29	Kenosha	Wisconsin	Daily	Unknown		
The Knickerbocker News	Jimmy Carter	October 22	Albany	New York	Daily	Richard Nixon		
Lake Geneva Regional News	Gerald Ford	October 28	Lake Geneva	Wisconsin	Daily	Unknown		
Los Angeles Evening and Sunday Herald Examiner	Gerald Ford	October 27	Los Angeles	California	Daily	Richard Nixon		
Los Angeles Times	None (Note: The Los Angeles Times does not make endorsements for president as of 1973.)	October 31	Los Angeles	California	Daily	Richard Nixon		
Marshall News Messenger	Gerald Ford	October 31	Marshall	Texas	Daily	Unknown		
Midland Daily News	None	November 1	Midland	Michigan	Daily	None		
Monroe Morning World	Gerald Ford	October 3	Monroe	Louisiana	Daily	Unknown		
The Montgomery Advertiser and Alabama Journal	Jimmy Carter	October 31	Montgomery	Alabama	Daily	Richard Nixon		
The Morning Herald and Daily Mail	Gerald Ford	October 29	Hagerstown	Maryland	Daily	Unknown		
Muscatine Journal	None (Note: The Muscatine Journal does not make endorsements for president as of 1972.)	October 26	Muscatine	Iowa	Daily	None		
The Muskegon Chronicle	Gerald Ford	October 30	Muskegon	Michigan	Daily	Richard Nixon		
The New Mexican	Jimmy Carter	October 28	Santa Fe	New Mexico	Daily	Unknown		
The New York Times	Jimmy Carter	October 24	New York City	New York	Daily	George McGovern		
The News	Gerald Ford	October 27	Port Arthur	Texas	Daily	Unknown		
The News-Democrat	Split (Note: The News-Democrat's editorial board could not agree on whether to pick Ford or Carter and decided to write their separate views on picking a president.)	October 31	Belleville	Illinois	Daily	Unknown		
The News-Times	Gerald Ford	October 31	Danbury	Connecticut	Daily	Unknown		
Omaha World-Herald	Gerald Ford	October 27	Omaha	Nebraska	Daily	Richard Nixon		
The Oregonian	Gerald Ford	October 31	Portland	Oregon	Daily	Unknown		
Oshkosh Daily Northwestern	Gerald Ford	October 28	Oshkosh	Wisconsin	Daily	Unknown		
The Paris Post-Intelligencer	None	October 29	Paris	Tennessee	Daily	Unknown		
The Parsons Sun	Gerald Ford	October 25	Parsons	Kansas	Daily	Unknown		
The Philadelphia Inquirer	Gerald Ford	October 24	Philadelphia	Pennsylvania	Daily	Richard Nixon		
The Plain Dealer	Gerald Ford	November 4	Cleveland	Ohio	Daily	Richard Nixon		
The Sacramento Bee	Jimmy Carter	October 26	Sacramento	California	Daily	None		
Sarasota Journal	Gerald Ford	October 28	Sarasota	Florida	Daily	Richard Nixon		
San Angelo Standard-Times (Note: Both papers are separate but they share the same editorial board.)	Gerald Ford	October 31	San Angelo	Texas	Daily	Unknown		
San Antonio Express and The News	Gerald Ford	October 31	San Antonio	Texas	Daily	Richard Nixon		
San Antonio Light	Gerald Ford	October 31	San Antonio	Texas	Daily	Richard Nixon		
San Francisco Chronicle	Gerald Ford	October 25	San Francisco	California	Daily	Richard Nixon		
San Francisco Examiner	Gerald Ford	October 31	San Francisco	California	Daily	Richard Nixon		
The Scranton Times	Jimmy Carter	October 25	Scranton	Pennsylvania	Daily	Unknown		
Seattle Post-Intelligencer	Jimmy Carter	October 31	Seattle	Washington	Daily	Richard Nixon		
The Spokesman-Review	Gerald Ford	October 24	Spokane	Washington	Daily	Unknown		
Springfield Leader and Press and Daily News	Gerald Ford	October 24	Springfield	Missouri	Daily	Unknown		
St. Charles Herald	Gerald Ford	October 24	Hahnville	Louisiana	Weekly	Unknown		
The State	Gerald Ford	October 31	Columbia	South Carolina	Daily	Richard Nixon		
Staten Island Advance	Gerald Ford	October 24	Staten Island	New York	Daily	Richard Nixon		
The Tennessean	Jimmy Carter	October 17	Nashville	Tennessee	Daily	George McGovern		
The Times Herald	Jimmy Carter	October 31	Port Huron	Michigan	Daily	Unknown		
The Times-Picayune	Gerald Ford	October 27	New Orleans	Louisiana	Daily	Unknown		
Times Record	Jimmy Carter	October 26	Brunswick	Maine	Daily	George McGovern		
Times-Union	Gerald Ford	October 20	Rochester	New York	Daily	Richard Nixon		
Traverse City Record-Eagle	Gerald Ford	October 25	Traverse City	Michigan	Daily	Richard Nixon		
Tulsa Daily World	Gerald Ford	October 24	Tulsa	Oklahoma	Daily	Unknown		
Vicksburg Evening Post	Gerald Ford	October 17	Vicksburg	Mississippi	Daily	Unknown		
Wisconsin State Journal	Gerald Ford	October 25	Madison	Wisconsin	Daily	Unknown		

== School newspapers ==
Newspaper	1976 endorsement	Endorsement date	City	State	Type	1972 endorsement	Reference(s)	
Newspaper	1976 endorsement	Endorsement date	City	State	Type	1972 endorsement	1976	1972
The Daily Illini	Jimmy Carter	October 28	Urbana	Illinois	Daily	Unknown		

== See also ==
- 1976 United States presidential election
- Gerald Ford 1976 presidential campaign
- Jimmy Carter 1976 presidential campaign
