= Lists of newspaper endorsements in United States presidential elections =

Newspapers in the United States have traditionally endorsed candidates for party nomination and President. See:

== Primaries ==
- Newspaper endorsements in the 2008 United States presidential primaries
- Newspaper endorsements in the 2012 United States presidential primaries
- Newspaper endorsements in the 2016 United States presidential primaries
- News media endorsements in the 2020 United States presidential primaries
- News media endorsements in the 2024 United States presidential primaries

== General elections ==
- Newspaper endorsements in the 1900 United States presidential election
- Newspaper endorsements in the 1904 United States presidential election
- Newspaper endorsements in the 1976 United States presidential election
- Newspaper endorsements in the 1980 United States presidential election
- Newspaper endorsements in the 1984 United States presidential election
- Newspaper endorsements in the 1988 United States presidential election
- Newspaper endorsements in the 1992 United States presidential election
- Newspaper endorsements in the 1996 United States presidential election
- Newspaper endorsements in the 2000 United States presidential election
- Newspaper endorsements in the 2004 United States presidential election
- Newspaper endorsements in the 2008 United States presidential election
  - Newspaper endorsements for John McCain in the 2008 United States presidential election
  - Newspaper endorsements for Barack Obama in the 2008 United States presidential election
- Newspaper endorsements in the 2012 United States presidential election
- Newspaper endorsements in the 2016 United States presidential election
- News media endorsements in the 2020 United States presidential election
- News media endorsements in the 2024 United States presidential election
