= Lorraine Dusky =

American journalist

Lorraine Dusky (born June 13, 1942) is an American journalist, editor, and author and an advocate for adoption reform. She is more commonly known as the author of Birthmark (1979), the first memoir from the perspective of a birth mother.

== Early life and education ==
Lorraine Dusky was born in Detroit, Michigan, to Victoria Wrozek and Harry Dusky. She attended Wayne State University, where she earned her Bachelor of Arts degree in journalism in 1964.

== Career ==
Dusky began her journalism career as a newspaper reporter in the Midwest and later moved to the Rochester Democrat & Chronicle and the Albany Knickerbocker News.

She then relocated to New York City, where she served as a senior editor at Town & Country, McCall's, and Working Woman magazines. Her freelance writing has appeared in The New York Times Magazine, Newsweek, USA Today, and Glamour. She earned journalism awards from the New York Medical Society, the National Women’s Political Caucus, and other professional associations.

In 1976, she published a bylined essay in Town & Country about placing her child for adoption, which garnered national attention and led to a segment on the Today Show in September 1976.

In 1979, she expanded this narrative into her memoir, Birthmark. The book was the first of its kind by a birth mother and addressed the deeply personal and emotional experience of surrendering a child for adoption during a time of significant social stigma.

Her second memoir, Hole in My Heart: A Memoir and Report from the Fault Lines of Adoption, was self-published in 2015 and republished in an expanded edition by Grand Canyon Press in 2023. [2]

== Publications ==
- "Birthmark" (1979)
- "Still Unequal: The Shameful Truth about Women and Justice in America" (1996)
- "The Best Companies for Women" (1988)
- "How to Eat Like a Thin Person" (1982)
- "Total Vision" (1978)
- "Hole In My Heart" (2015, 2nd edition 2023)
