= Newspaper endorsements in the 2012 United States presidential primaries =

Newspapers in the United States have traditionally endorsed candidates for party nomination prior to their final endorsements for President. Below is the list of endorsements in 2012, by candidate, for each primary race.

== Democrats ==
=== Barack Obama ===
President Barack Obama had no significant opposition in his campaign for renomination in 2012. However, the following newspapers specifically endorsed him for the Democratic nomination:

| Newspaper | State |
|---|---|
| San Antonio Express-News | Texas |
| Kansas City Star | Missouri |
| The Citizen (Laconia) | New Hampshire |

== Republicans ==
=== Newt Gingrich ===
| Newspaper | State |
|---|---|
| New Hampshire Union Leader (Manchester) | New Hampshire |
| The Tampa Tribune | Florida |

=== Jon Huntsman ===
| Newspaper | State |
|---|---|
| The State (Columbia) | South Carolina |
| The Boston Globe | Massachusetts |
| The Citizen (Laconia) | New Hampshire |
| Concord Monitor | New Hampshire |
| The Keene Sentinel | New Hampshire |
| Valley News (White River Junction) | Vermont |

=== Ron Paul ===
| Newspaper | State |
|---|---|
| NJToday.net (Elizabeth) | New Jersey |
| Independent Florida Alligator (University of Florida) | Florida |
| Littleton Courier | New Hampshire |
| Berlin Reporter (Lancaster) | New Hampshire |
| Coos County Democrat (Lancaster) | New Hampshire |
| The Daily Iowan (University of Iowa) | Iowa |

=== Mitt Romney ===
| Newspaper | State |
|---|---|
| San Antonio Express-News | Texas |
| Houston Chronicle | Texas |
| Pittsburgh Post-Gazette | Pennsylvania |
| Pittsburgh Tribune-Review | Pennsylvania |
| Hartford Courant | Connecticut |
| The Baltimore Sun | Maryland |
| Milwaukee Journal Sentinel | Wisconsin |
| Journal Star (Peoria) | Illinois |
| Chicago Tribune | Illinois |
| Daily Herald (Arlington Heights) | Illinois |
| The Birmingham News | Alabama |
| The Plain Dealer (Cleveland) | Ohio |
| The Cincinnati Enquirer | Ohio |
| The Columbus Dispatch | Ohio |
| The Arizona Republic (Phoenix) | Arizona |
| Detroit Free Press | Michigan |
| The Grand Rapids Press | Michigan |
| The Oakland Press (Pontiac) | Michigan |
| The Detroit News | Michigan |
| The Denver Post | Colorado |
| Kansas City Star | Missouri |
| Reno Gazette-Journal | Nevada |
| Las Vegas Review-Journal | Nevada |
| Orlando Sentinel | Florida |
| Tampa Bay Times (St. Petersburg) | Florida |
| Lakeland Ledger | Florida |
| Pensacola News Journal | Florida |
| The Post and Courier (Charleston) | South Carolina |
| The State (Columbia) | South Carolina |
| The Greenville News | South Carolina |
| The Charlotte Observer | North Carolina |
| The Telegraph (Nashua) | New Hampshire |
| Boston Herald | Massachusetts |
| Quad-City Times (Davenport) | Iowa |
| Iowa City Press-Citizen | Iowa |
| The Portsmouth Herald | New Hampshire |
| The Hampton Union | New Hampshire |
| The Exeter News-Letter | New Hampshire |
| The Oklahoman (Oklahoma City) | Oklahoma |
| Des Moines Register | Iowa |
| The Washington Examiner | District of Columbia |
| Sioux City Journal | Iowa |
