= News media endorsements in the 2024 United States presidential primaries =

Newspapers and other news media in the United States traditionally endorse candidates for party nomination for President of the United States, and later endorse one of the ultimate nominees for president. Below is a list of notable endorsements by news media in 2024, by candidate, for each primary race.

== Democrats ==
=== Joe Biden ===
Publication	State	Endorsement date	Ref.
The Boston Globe	Massachusetts	April 25, 2023	
Las Vegas Sun	Nevada	January 28, 2024	
The Seattle Times	Washington	February 2, 2024	
Los Angeles Sentinel	California	February 8, 2024	
The Austin Chronicle	Texas	February 16, 2024	
Santa Barbara Independent	California	February 16, 2024	
San Antonio Express-News	Texas	February 18, 2024	
Houston Chronicle	Texas	February 19, 2024	
The Palm Beach Post	Florida	February 24, 2024	
Bay Area Reporter	California	February 27, 2024	
Eugene Weekly	Oregon	May 2, 2024	

=== Dean Phillips ===
Publication	State	Endorsement date	Ref.
Conway Daily Sun	New Hampshire	January 19, 2024	
New Hampshire Union Leader (Manchester)	New Hampshire	January 22, 2024	
The Detroit News	Michigan	February 7, 2024	

=== Uncommitted ===
The following publications specifically endorsed a vote for "uncommitted" delegates, which is an option in some presidential primaries.

Publication	State	Endorsement date	Ref.
Metro Times (Detroit)	Michigan	February 15, 2024	
The Arab American News (Dearborn)	Michigan	February 24, 2024	
The Stranger (Seattle)	Washington	February 27, 2024	

== Republicans ==
=== Ron DeSantis ===
Publication	State	Endorsement date	Ref.
Sioux City Journal	Iowa	January 13, 2024	

=== Nikki Haley ===
Publication	State	Endorsement date	Ref.
The Post and Courier (Charleston)	South Carolina	October 21, 2023	
Conway Daily Sun	New Hampshire	January 19, 2024	
New Hampshire Union Leader (Manchester)	New Hampshire	January 20, 2024	
The Boston Globe	Massachusetts	January 21, 2024	
Las Vegas Weekly	Nevada	January 25, 2024	
Las Vegas Sun	Nevada	January 28, 2024	
The Seattle Times	Washington	February 2, 2024	
The Detroit News	Michigan	February 7, 2024	
San Antonio Express-News	Texas	February 18, 2024	
Houston Chronicle	Texas	February 19, 2024	

=== Asa Hutchinson ===
Publication	State	Endorsement date	Ref.
Storm Lake Times Pilot	Iowa	January 10, 2024	

=== Donald Trump ===
Publication	State	Endorsement date	Ref.
Rhino Times (Greensboro)	North Carolina	February 27, 2024	

== See also ==
- Lists of newspaper endorsements in United States presidential elections
