= Daily Review Atlas =

Newspaper in Monmouth, Illinois

- Type: Weekly newspaper
- Owner: USA Today Co.
- Publisher: David Adams
- Founded: 1890, as The Monmouth Daily Review
- Political alignment: Center-right
- Headquarters: 400 South Main Street, Monmouth, Illinois 61462, United States
- OCLC number: 27702244
- Website: reviewatlas.com

The Daily Review Atlas, more commonly referred to by local residents as the Review Atlas, is now an American newspaper published weekly in Monmouth, Illinois. It is owned by USA Today Co.

It was formed in 1924 through the merger of The Monmouth Daily Atlas (founded c. 1904) and The Monmouth Daily Review (began daily publication in 1890). In 1987, the paper was acquired by Hollinger. Current owner GateHouse Media purchased roughly 160 daily and weekly newspapers from Hollinger in 1997.

In addition to the Review Atlas, GateHouse owns the leading paper in the Galesburg area, The Register-Mail, and several area weeklies.

It had temporarily closed because of COVID-19, but has since reopened.
