= The Register-Mail =

American daily newspaper

- Type: Daily newspaper
- Owner: USA Today Co.
- Publisher: David Adams
- Editor: Tom Martin
- Founded: c. 1891, as The Galesburg Daily Mail
- Headquarters: 140 South Prairie Street, Galesburg, Illinois 61401, United States
- Circulation: 10,059 Daily; 10,532 Sunday (as of 2012)
- OCLC number: 10127198
- Website: galesburg.com

The Register-Mail is an American daily newspaper published in Galesburg, Illinois. The paper was owned by the Pritchard family from 1896 to 1989, when it was sold to the Journal Star. Copley Press bought both papers for $174.5 million. In 2007, GateHouse Media bought Copley's Illinois and Ohio papers.

In addition to the daily newspaper, GateHouse also publishes Knox County Neighbors, a weekly newspaper serving Knox County and the Galesburg area, and the Daily Review Atlas in neighboring Monmouth, Warren County.

== See also ==
- Omer N. Custer
