= The Gainesville Times (Georgia) =

Daily newspaper in Gainesville, Georgia, U.S.

- Type: Daily newspaper
- Format: Broadsheet
- Owner: Metro Market Media
- Editor-in-chief: Shannon Casas
- General manager: Norman Baggs
- Founded: 1947
- Language: English
- Headquarters: 346 Green Street, NW Gainesville, GA 30501
- Website: https://www.gainesvilletimes.com

The Gainesville Times is a daily newspaper based in Gainesville, Georgia, that covers Hall County and Northeast Georgia. As of 2026, the Group Publisher is Stephanie Woody and the Managing Editor is John Chambliss; the headquarters are located at 345 Green Street, NW, Gainesville, GA 30501.

Circulation delivery is weekly on Wednesday inside Hall County and Wednesday-Friday in other areas. They print weekly on Wednesdays.

== History ==
The Gainesville Times was founded after World War II by Charles and Lessie Smithgall under the original name The Gainesville Daily Times. It was first published at 303 Washington Street, Gainesville, Georgia. Ray Hull was the first editor, and Sylvan Meyer was his main reporter. The first issue came from a second-hand flatbed press in a former funeral home on January 26, 1947. Since that Sunday morning, the Times has never missed a run. The newspaper, printed daily Sunday through Friday, began with a printing capacity of eight pages per press run. Its circulation reached about 4,000 before the end of the first year.

In 1952, the Gainesville Daily Times moved around the block to 308 W. Spring Street, sharing a building known as the Press-Radio Center, also owned by the Smithgalls. That same year a fire started in the composing room but the paper was still released that day with help from other printers around town. Sylvan Meyer soon became managing editor and then head editor, helping the newspaper grow.

In 1957, the newspaper had grown enough to buy a more modern rotary press, which allowed the printers to run thirty-two pages per press run. The "Gainesville" was then dropped from the title to convey a broader coverage area.

In 1970, the Daily Times acquired a new facility on North Green Street to install an offset press with improved technology. The first paper from this new press was printed on April 27. The "Daily" was dropped from the newspaper's name in 1972.

In 1981, The Times was sold to Gannett Co. Inc. and by the next year, Gannett expanded the press to accommodate printing of USA Today for parts of the Southeast.

In 2004, The Times was sold to Morris Multimedia Inc., the largest privately owned media organization in the United States. The current owner, Metro Market Media, took over in 2018.

== Coverage ==
=== Sections ===
- News
- Life - Articles about lifestyle choices and events
- Get Out - Articles about events happening around Northeast Georgia
- Sports - Articles on sports teams specifically from Northeast Georgia
- Opinion
- Obituaries
- Columnists
- Newsletters
- Puzzles

=== Significant stories ===
"County Touches Off Avoidable Firestorm" by The Times Editorial Board. It was described by the Georgia Associated Press as, an "Excellent example of holding public officials accountable, spotlighting their efforts to avoid keeping the public informed until it’s to their benefit to do otherwise and laying out the cost in dollars and public trust."

== Awards ==
- Georgia Associated Press Best Feature Photo of the Year 2017
- Georgia Associated Press Best Spot News Photo of the Year 2017
- Georgia Associated Press Best Picture Story of the Year 2017
- Georgia Associated Press Best Editorial Writing of the Year 2017
