= Grand Haven Tribune =

Newspaper in Grand Haven, Michigan, US

- Type: Daily newspaper
- Format: Broadsheet
- Owner: Paxton Media Group
- Publisher: David Holgate
- Editor: Matt DeYoung
- Founded: 1885
- Headquarters: 700 Washington St., Suite 140, Grand Haven, MI. 49417
- Circulation: 3,529 (as of 2022)
- ISSN: 2332-631X
- OCLC number: 27827807
- Website: grandhaventribune.com

The Grand Haven Tribune is a day mailed newspaper in Grand Haven, Michigan. The Tribune serves the residents of Tri-Cities area, which primarily includes Grand Haven, Spring Lake and Ferrysburg. Its coverage area also includes Nunica, Fruitport, Crockery and Robinson Townships and West Olive. The Tribune publishes print editions Tuesday through Saturday.

== History ==
The first issue of the daily newspaper was published July 10, 1885. The newspaper was then called The Evening Venture. It was published by the Northrup brothers — Edward Northrup was editor. They published the paper for 92 issues until Oct. 24, 1885, when they sold it to Charles K. Esler — who changed the name of the paper to The Evening Tribune. Esler sold it to Charles Conger in 1889, who sold it to Horace Nichols in May 1891. Nichols changed the name of the paper to The Grand Haven Daily Tribune with the April 3, 1896 edition. Since 1969 it has been called the Grand Haven Tribune. On June 3, 2019 the newspaper was again sold to the Paxton Media Group and its operations consolidated.

== Awards ==
The Tribune was named Class D, Newspaper of the Year by the Michigan Press Association in 2013 and 2014, and was named Best Newspaper in Michigan by the Associated Press in 2014.
