= The Broken Arrow Ledger =

- Type: Weekly newspaper
- Owner(s): BH Media
- Publisher: Tulsa World
- Founded: 1904
- Ceased publication: February 22, 2017
- Headquarters: 315 S. Boulder Ave., Tulsa, Oklahoma United States
- Circulation: 17,500
- ISSN: 1097-0541
- OCLC number: 38005841
- Website: baledger.com

The Broken Arrow Ledger was a weekly newspaper published on Wednesdays in Broken Arrow, Oklahoma from 1904 to 2017.

== History ==
The newspaper was established in 1904. Over the century, the names have changed, i.e. Broken Arrow Ledger-Democrat, Broken Arrow Democrat, Broken Arrow Daily Ledger, Broken Arrow Scout, when new owners took over the company. The Broken Arrow Ledger was purchased as part of the Oklahoma Weekly Group in 2015 by BH Media, and was published by the Tulsa World. The final edition was published on February 22, 2017.
