= Beatrice Daily Sun =

Newspaper published in Beatrice, Nebraska

- Type: Daily newspaper
- Format: Broadsheet
- Owner: Lee Enterprises
- Founder: G. P. Marvin
- Editor: Rob Schlotterbeck
- Founded: 1902
- Language: American English
- Headquarters: 108 South 6th Street; Beatrice, Nebraska
- Country: United States
- OCLC number: 13412877
- Website: beatricedailysun.com

The Beatrice Daily Sun is a newspaper published in Beatrice, Nebraska, in southeastern Nebraska.

== History ==
The Daily Sun was founded in 1902 by G. P. Marvin, who had previously published the Gage County Democrat. After Marvin died in 1908, his son, E. M. Marvin, continued publication of the paper. In 1924, The Daily Sun purchased the Beatrice Daily Express, a competing newspaper. The paper was originally published as a morning paper, and in 1927, it switched to an evening paper.

After E. M. Marvin's retirement in 1964, his sons published the paper until 1974, when it was purchased by Stauffer Communications. Stauffer sold the Daily Sun to the American Publishing Company in 1990. In 1999, the paper was told to Community Newspaper Holdings, then to Liberty Group Publishing, then to Lee Enterprises.
