= The Tifton Gazette =

Weekly newspaper published in Tifton, Georgia

- Type: Weekly newspaper
- Format: Broadsheet
- Owner: Carpenter Media Group
- Founder: B. T. Allen
- Publisher: Laurie Gay
- Editor: Dean Poling
- Founded: 1888 (as Berrien County Pioneer)
- Headquarters: 1444-C North Tift Avenue, Tifton, Georgia 31794 United States
- Circulation: 5,862 (as of 2013)
- Website: tiftongazette.com

The Tifton Gazette is a weekly newspaper published in Tifton, Georgia. It is owned by Carpenter Media Group.

== History ==
B. T. Allen founded the Berrien County Pioneer in 1888. He moved the paper to Tifton in 1891 and renamed it to the Tifton Gazette. The paper was sold to J. L. Herring in 1896 who ran it until his death in 1923.

Community Newspaper Holdings Inc. acquired the paper in 2000 from Thomson. In May 2024, CNHI sold the newspaper to Carpenter Media Group.
