= The News-Star =

Newspaper in Monroe, Louisiana

- Type: Newspaper
- Owner: USA Today Co.
- Language: English
- Headquarters: Monroe, Louisiana, United States
- Website: thenewsstar.com

The News-Star is a newspaper in Monroe, Louisiana. It is part of the USA Today Network and is owned by USA Today Co.

== History ==
The newspaper was founded in 1890 as The Evening News. In 1909, The Evening News merged with the Daily Star to form The Monroe News-Star.

Robert Ewing, publisher of The New Orleans States and The Shreveport Times, founded The Monroe Morning World in 1929 and acquired The News-Star the next year. Ewing had purchased The Shreveport Times in 1908 and bought the Monroe papers in the late 1920s.

The Monroe papers remained with the Ewing family until Gannett acquired them on June 16, 1977. The Morning World and The News-Star were consolidated on August 4, 1980, as The News-Star-World. The name was changed again, and the first edition of The News-Star under that title was published on May 22, 1988.

== Publication history and archives ==
The newspaper's predecessor and related titles include Monroe Daily Star, published from 1897 to 1909; Monroe News-Star, published from 1909 to 1979; Monroe Morning World, published from 1929 to 1978; Morning World, published from 1978 to 1980; News-Star, published from 1979 to 1980; News-Star-World, published from 1980 to 1988; and News-Star, published from 1988 onward.

Runs of the Monroe titles are held in newspaper databases and on microfilm. The Ouachita Parish Public Library lists access to Daily Telegraph, Monroe Morning World, Monroe News-Star, Register and Weekly News-Star through its newspaper database resources. Louisiana State University lists microfilm holdings for Monroe Morning World, Morning World, News-Star-World and The News-Star.

== Ownership ==
Gannett acquired the Monroe papers from the Ewing family in 1977. Gannett changed its corporate name to USA Today Co. on November 18, 2025.

== See also ==
- List of newspapers in Louisiana
- Monroe, Louisiana
- USA Today Network
