= Knickerbocker News =

Former daily newspaper in Albany, New York

The Knickerbocker News
- Owner: Hearst Corporation
- Publisher: Joseph T. Lyons
- Editor: Harry M. Rosenfeld
- Managing editor: Benard A. Zovistoski; William M. Dowd
- Founded: September 4, 1843
- Ceased publication: April 15, 1988
- OCLC number: 5729645

The Knickerbocker News (popularly known as The Knick) of Albany, New York was a daily newspaper published from September 4, 1843, (when it was founded as The Albany Knickerbocker) in the capital city of New York State until April 15, 1988, when it was merged into a co-owned publication.

The founder was Hugh J. Hastings, a young immigrant from County Fermanagh, Ireland, who worked as a reporter for several local newspapers before striking out on his own as a publisher/editor in the newspaper-rich community. He gave his newspaper its name in recognition of the region's deep Dutch heritage. (Albany began as the Dutch settlement of Beverwyck, then became Fort Orange after the British takeover, and eventually was renamed Albany after the English Duke of Albany.) Over the years, Hastings (who became politically influential before eventually selling his company and moving to Monmouth, New Jersey, where he worked as a publisher until his death in a carriage accident) and his successor owners purchased and absorbed numerous competitors, and for decades the publication had the highest daily circulation in New York's Capital Region.

What came to be called The Knickerbocker News after it absorbed the competing Albany Evening News was sold to the Gannett Company in 1928. In 1960, Gannett sold it to the Hearst Corporation, the same year in which Hearst sold one of its two Rochester, NY, newspapers to Gannett, in effect giving each communications giant a virtual monopoly in the two respective upstate cities.

The evening newspaper's last editor, albeit for a very brief period, was Harry M. Rosenfeld, who had been hired from the editorial staff of The Washington Post by the Hearst Corp. about a year earlier to serve as the editor of that newspaper and its sister publication, the Albany Times Union.

William Miles Dowd [born June 13, 1942], a veteran writer and editor who had been the associate managing editor of Hearst's Baltimore News-American before moving to Albany in February 1977 to oversee The Knickerbocker News' daily operations, was the paper's last managing editor. Dowd, who previously had worked with newspapers belonging to the Brush-Moore, Gannett, and Thompson chains, also wrote an award-winning column that contributed to the publication winning more than 100 journalism awards under his supervision in its final decade.

When The Knickerbocker News staff and resources were folded into the Times Union, under corporate orders no layoffs were made, an unusual decision in an industry in which staffing reductions during mergers had become the norm to cut costs.

According to The New York Times in 1988, The Knick's circulation "heyday in the 1930s and 1940s" it "was known for aggressive reporting, strong political coverage and a readable style." It continued to be known for those characteristics as shown by its annual harvest of journalism awards until its final days of publication.

The Knickerbocker News' circulation peaked at about 71,000 in 1972-73, which made it the largest newspaper at that time in New York's Capital Region, but had fallen to about 28,000 by the late 1980s. That precipitous decline was a fate that overtook most afternoon newspapers in the United States during the same period as major changes in the manufacturing sector resulted in changes in readership cycles by people who had been mainstays of newspaper purchasing before they began working different shifts and sought morning publications.
