= Midland Reporter-Telegram =

Daily newspaper in Midland, Texas

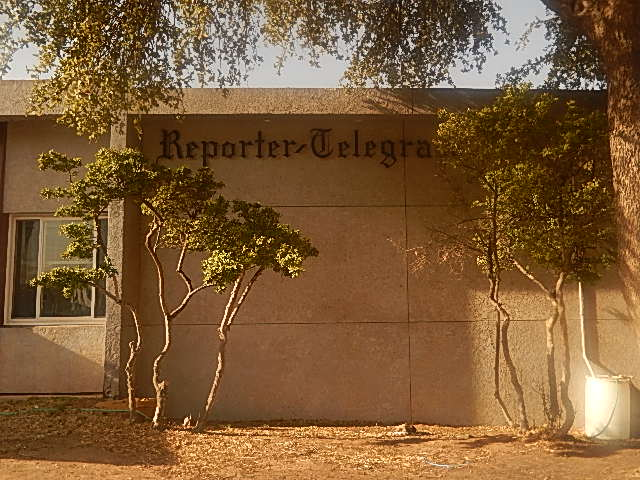
- Type: Daily newspaper
- Format: Broadsheet
- Owner: Hearst Communications
- Publisher: Ed Fritz
- Editor: Trevor Hawes
- Founded: 1929
- Headquarters: 15 Smith Road, Suite 1004; Midland, Texas, US 79705
- Circulation: 8,707 (as of 2023)
- Website: mrt.com

The Midland Reporter-Telegram is a daily newspaper in Midland, Texas. It is located in the heart of the vast 54-county Permian Basin of West Texas, a geological region which produces 70 percent of the oil in Texas. The newspaper's special coverage includes the "Permian Basin Oil Report", a weekly section devoted to news of the gas and oil industry, and Mywesttexasjobs.com, a weekly employment magazine that is free to the community and has a wide distribution throughout the Permian Basin.

The Reporter-Telegram is a Hearst Corporation publication, having been acquired by the corporation in 1979.

The Reporter-Telegram moved from its longtime location at 201 E. Illinois Ave. to the Apex Building in ClayDesta — 15 Smith Road, Suite 1004 — on Nov. 22, 2021.

== Staff ==
In October 2015, Hearst named Jeffrey P. Shabram as Publisher of the Midland Reporter-Telegram and its West Texas companion publications, The Plainview Daily Herald in Plainview, The Canyon News in Canyon, and The Muleshoe Journal in Muleshoe, Texas. Prior to the appointment, Shabram was Vice President of Midland Newspapers and Senior Director of Digital for Berkshire Hathaway Media based in Omaha, Nebraska.

Robert Granfeldt became the general manager of Hearst's West Texas publications in June 2020. Granfeldt left Hearst in 2025 to become a regional president at Adams Multimedia. He was replaced by Ed Fritz.

Longtime employee Stewart Doreen left his role as editor in December 2023, having spent nearly 29 years at the Reporter-Telegram. Doreen was promoted from managing editor to editor in October 2010, replacing Gary Ott, who retired that same month.

Trevor Hawes began as editorial director in May 2024. He started at the Reporter-Telegram in 2010 as a copy editor and was promoted to news editor that same year. He shifted to the role of assistant managing editor of business and oil in 2016. His reporting on transportation issues in the Permian Basin earned him the American Planning Association Texas Chapter journalism award in 2017. Hawes left the Reporter-Telegram in May 2026.

Mary Gilda Dearen (born 1955) was the managing editor. She retired after 39 years in December 2019. She is married to western novelist and historian Patrick Dearen.

Current journalists include Luke Dias, Mella McEwen, and Kessly Salinas.

In December 2020, The Reporter-Telegram moved to a five day printing schedule, eliminating its printed Sunday and Monday editions.

Chris Tribbey joined the Reporter-Telegram as editor on October 5, 2026.
