= Battle Creek Enquirer =

American newspaper

- Battle Creek Enquirer logo
- Type: Daily newspaper
- Format: Broadsheet
- Owner: USA Today Co.
- Editor: Michael McCullough
- Headquarters: 77 E. Michigan Ave., Suite 101; Battle Creek, Michigan 49017; United States
- Circulation: 7,675 Daily; 11,303 Sunday (as of 2022)
- OCLC number: 33956507
- Website: battlecreekenquirer.com

The Battle Creek Enquirer is a daily newspaper in Battle Creek, Michigan. The newspaper, owned by the USA Today Co., is the only daily paper serving Calhoun County, Michigan, and parts of four neighboring counties.

In 1918, the Evening News and the Battle Creek Enquirer merged, creating the Battle Creek Enquirer and Evening News. This lasted until 1922, it became the Enquirer and News, until 1983, when it became the Battle Creek Enquirer.

In the late 1950s, the Enquirer sponsored the George Award, which was meant to recognize civic-minded citizens.

In the 1971, the Miller Family Enterprise, Federated Publications, became a wholly owned subsidiary of Gannett Co., Inc.

Beginning Sept. 25, 2023, the paper began being delivered by the U.S. Postal Service instead of by carrier.
