= Southwest Times Record =

Daily newspaper in Arkansas

- Type: Daily newspaper
- Format: Broadsheet
- Owner: USA Today Co.
- Editor: Amos Bridges
- Founded: 1884
- Language: English
- Headquarters: 5111 Rogers Ave., Suite 471; Fort Smith, Arkansas 72903; United States
- Circulation: 13,297 (as of 2018)
- Website: swtimes.com

The Southwest Times Record is a daily newspaper in Fort Smith, Arkansas, and covers 10 counties in western Arkansas and eastern Oklahoma. It is owned and published by USA Today Co.

== History ==
The Times Record began as three separate papers: the Fort Smith Times, the Fort Smith News Record, and the Southwest American. The Fort Smith Times began publishing in December 1884 as an afternoon newspaper. The Fort Smith News Record, established in the spring of 1893, was also an afternoon publication. The Southwest American, a morning daily, began publishing in 1907. In July 1909, the Times and the News Record merged as the Fort Smith Times Record.

In 1920, boyhood friends John S. Parks and George D. Carney purchased the Fort Smith Times Record, and in 1923, they also bought the American. They continued to publish the American in the morning and the Times Record in the evening, maintaining separate editorial staff. On Sundays, the two combined into one edition—the Southwest Times Record.

On March 23, 1940, Parks and Carney sold the American and the Times Record to 33-year-old Donald W. Reynolds, owner of the Okmulgee Daily Times. His purchase of the Times Record and American marked the start of the Donrey Media Group. In 1969, Donrey halted separate delivery of the afternoon Times Record and morning American, merging the papers into a single seven-day morning paper under the Southwest Times Record name. It currently publishes daily under that moniker.

The paper remained the flagship of Donrey until Reynolds' death in 1993. Reynolds' longtime friend Jack Stephens bought the company, changed its name to Stephens Media Group in 2002 and later to Stephens Media LLC, and moved the headquarters to Las Vegas, Nevada, home of the group's largest property, the Las Vegas Review-Journal. In 2015, the Stephens Media newspapers were sold to New Media Investment Group.

As of October 2026, the newspaper quit posting local stories.

== Subsidiary publications ==
- River Valley Advertiser (Fort Smith)
- Booneville Democrat
- Paris Express
- Press Argus-Courier (Crawford County)
- Charleston Express
- Greenwood Life
