= Rockford Register Star =

Newspaper in Illinois, United States

- The front page of the Register Star on October 27, 2005
- Type: Daily newspaper
- Format: Broadsheet
- Owner: USA Today Co.
- Founded: February 15, 1855; 171 years ago, as Register Republic; March 20, 1888; 138 years ago, as Morning Star; 1979; 47 years ago (as Rockford Register Star)
- Headquarters: 99 East State Street, Rockford, Illinois, United States
- Circulation: 18,356 Daily; 24,434 Sunday (as of 2018)
- OCLC number: 5004029
- Website: rrstar.com

The Rockford Register Star is the primary daily newspaper of the Rockford, Illinois, metropolitan area. The fifth-highest circulation newspaper in Illinois, the Register Star takes its name from the 1979 merger of two predecessors, the Register Republic (founded February 15, 1855, daily since January 6, 1873) and the Morning Star (founded March 20, 1888). The Register Star is currently owned by USA Today Co., which reacquired the paper upon merging with GateHouse Media in 2019. Gannett had previously owned the paper and its predecessors from 1967 to 2007.

== Headquarters ==
The newspaper is published from the Register Star Tower at 99 East State Street in Downtown Rockford, Illinois. Printing operations moved to West Milwaukee in April 2020 at the Gannett owned Milwaukee Journal Sentinel printing press. On March 14, 2022, Gannett closed the West Milwaukee printing press and production of the Register Star was moved to the Peoria Journal Star printing press in Peoria. The tower was built in 1930 and remains a Rockford landmark to this day, as it is still recognized as one of the most appealing buildings in downtown. It was designed to be similar in appearance to the Tribune Tower in Chicago.

== Format ==
The publication's general format is customary to that of most papers around the nation; it contains a front page and an "A" section, followed by local and state news, sports, and business throughout the work week. On Sundays it publishes the Sunday Register Star, where ads for national chains in the area are promoted along with the insertion of comics, the "Go" section, and USA Weekend magazine.

In 2003, the newspaper formed an alliance with WREX-TV. Newspaper reporters are seen on WREX-TV's newscasts on a daily basis promoting stories found in the Rockford Register Star, and the newspaper's website contains many videos of WREX's telecasted stories.

In January 2024, the paper announced it was switching from carrier to mail delivery via the U.S. Postal Service.

== Sources ==
- GateHouse buys Rockford Register Star
- Rockford Register Star
