= La Crosse Tribune =

Daily newspaper in La Crosse, Wisconsin

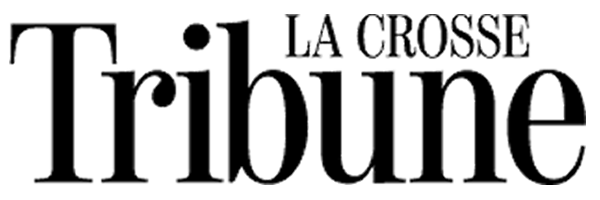
- Type: Daily newspaper
- Format: Broadsheet
- Owner: Lee Enterprises
- President: Paul Pehler
- Editor: Todd Krysiak
- Founded: May 16, 1904; 121 years ago
- Language: English
- Headquarters: 1407 St. Andrew Street; Suite A100; La Crosse, Wisconsin 54603
- Country: United States
- Circulation: 18,837 Daily (as of 2023)
- ISSN: 0745-9793
- OCLC number: 1755375
- Website: lacrossetribune.com

The La Crosse Tribune is a daily newspaper published in La Crosse, Wisconsin, covering the tri-state area of Wisconsin, Iowa, and Minnesota in the United States.

The paper was first founded in 1904, following a media scandal in which existing publications failed to report on the recent creation of a power monopoly in La Crosse. Today, the paper is owned by Lee Enterprises and is part of the River Valley Media Group.

== History ==
The first newspaper in La Crosse, Spirit of the Times, was founded in 1852 by A.D. La Due. In the course of the next 50 years, a variety of daily newspapers emerged in La Crosse. Most of these were founded along political lines, which caused them to come in conflict with one another, such as the La Crosse Democrat and the La Crosse Daily Republican, who notably circulated criticisms of the other's reporting of Abraham Lincoln's assassination. Many other papers catered to specific demographics, including two Norwegian-language publications, Amerika and Faedrelandet Og Emigranten, in addition to the Vlastenec, a Bohemian-language weekly paper. The city formerly had three German-language publications: Nord Stern, Die Wagle, and La Crosse Volksfreund. All three had fallen out of favor by the 1920s as a result of anti-German sentiment.

This was the case with many of such small independent newspapers in La Crosse, which had begun to fade out or merge with one another by the turn of the 20th century. Many of the remaining private publications lost favor in 1904, when they neglected to report on the merger of two power companies which created a monopoly in the area. Among the papers criticised for their "private-interests" was the Morning Chronicle. Its managing editor, Aaron M. Brayton, and three others left the Chronicle following the scandal and founded their own paper: the La Crosse Tribune. The Tribune was established with an initial $10,000 investment provided by 65 stockholders. It began publication on May 16, 1904.

The paper was not immediately successful, and was purchased in 1907 by Lee Enterprises, a media syndicate, for $15,000. Following the acquisition, the Tribune's founder, Brayton, remained the paper's editor and publisher. In 1917, the paper purchased its main competitor, The La Crosse Leader and Press, for $100,000. By this time, much of the paper's competition had died out and as a result of the merger, it became the city's only remaining daily newspaper. To reflect the merger, the publication's name was changed to The La Crosse Tribune and Leader Press. In 1944, the publication removed its homage to the Leader Press from its name, and reverted to being called the La Crosse Tribune. Independent weekly publications remain active, though the Tribune has been the only daily newspaper in La Crosse since 1917.

Today, the paper is part of the River Valley Media Group which also oversees the Winona Daily News and several local, weekly publications, including: the Coulee-Courier, Houston County News, Tomah Journal and Monitor Herald, Vernon County Broadcaster, and Westby Times. The Tribune was the original owner of WKTY, a local radio station. Regulations set by the Federal Communications Commission meant that the paper could not own the radio station and a TV station simultaneously. In order to invest in a new local TV station WKBT, it sold the radio station to Herbert H. Lee in 1954. The Tribune later divested its ownership of WKBT.

Starting June 6, 2023, the print edition of the newspaper will be reduced to three days a week: Tuesday, Thursday and Saturday. Also, the newspaper will transition from being delivered by a traditional newspaper delivery carrier to mail delivery by the U.S. Postal Service.

== Facilities ==
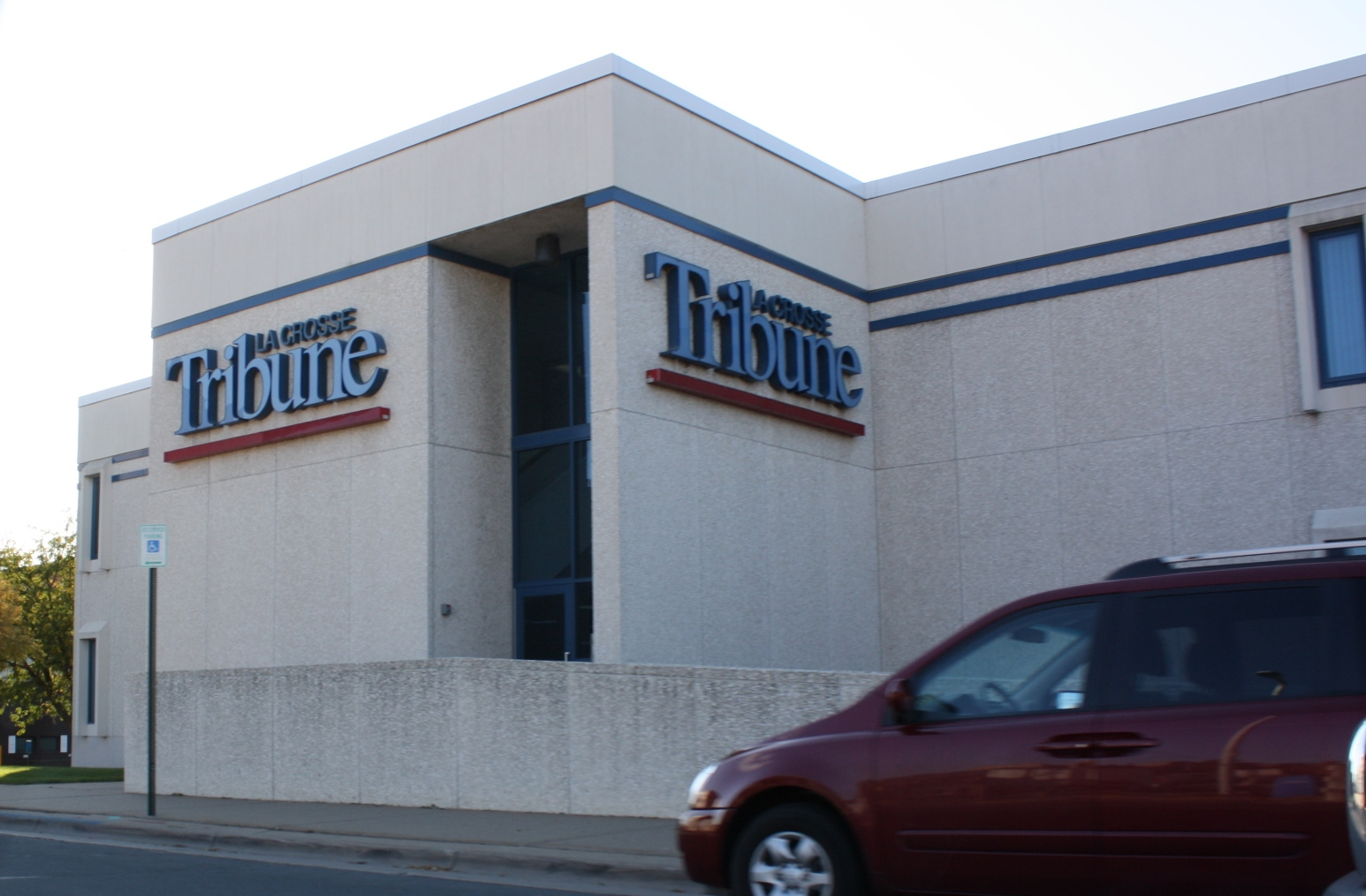
Former headquarters of the Tribune from 1973–2020.

The publication's original location was at 123 Main Street, in downtown La Crosse. As the paper expanded, it moved to spaces at Fifth Avenue and Jay street. In 1938 the Tribune relocated to a new building 435 Fourth Street South.

Again in 1973, the publication moved to a new building at 401 Third Street North. In 1996, a new printing and distribution center was erected next to the building. In 2019, the Tribune's printing moved offsite to a printing plant in Madison. This, along with smaller staff sizes, made much of the building's space unnecessary. In December 2019, it was sold by Lee Enterprises to a local developer for $1.9 million. The Tribune has since moved in to office spaces in the city's former LaCrosse Footwear factory.
