= Albert Lea Tribune =

Newspaper in Albert Lea, Minnesota

Coordinates: 43.644548°N 93.379474°W

- Type: Daily newspaper
- Owner: Boone Newspapers
- Publisher: Crystal Miller
- Managing editor: Sarah Stultz
- Photo editor: Colleen Harrison
- Founded: 1897
- Language: American English
- Headquarters: 808 W. Front Street; Albert Lea, MN 56007
- City: Albert Lea
- Country: United States
- Circulation: 3,552 (as of 2024)
- ISSN: 1051-7421
- OCLC number: 20607968
- Website: albertleatribune.com

The Albert Lea Tribune is an American, English language newspaper published in Albert Lea, Minnesota. It was founded in 1897. It is published Wednesdays and Saturdays owned by Boone Newspapers.

== History ==
The Albert Lea Tribune was founded in 1897. It has had several names:

- The Albert Lea Evening Tribune (1981-current)
- The Evening Tribune (1905-1981)
- The Albert Lea Evening Tribune (1898-1905)
