= The Beaumont Enterprise =

Newspaper in Beaumont, Texas, US

- The July 27, 2005 front page of The Beaumont Enterprise
- Type: Daily newspaper
- Format: Broadsheet
- Owner: Hearst Communications
- Founder: John W. Leonard
- Publisher: Jeff Bergin
- Editor: Uvie Bikomo
- Founded: 1880
- Headquarters: 380 Main Street; Beaumont, TX 77701; United States
- Circulation: 5,925 (as of 2023)
- Website: beaumontenterprise.com

The Beaumont Enterprise is a newspaper of Hearst Communications, headquartered in Beaumont, Texas. It has been in operation since 1880.

== History ==
John W. Leonard founded the initial Enterprise as a weekly newspaper in 1880. It became a daily under editor W.W. McLeod in 1896 or 1897, to compete with crosstown rival Beaumont Journal (founded 1889).

In 1907, William P. Hobby became manager and part owner of the Enterprise and bought the paper outright in 1920, while Governor of Texas. One of his co-owners was general manager/associate publisher James Mapes. According to the Texas State Historical Association, the Enterprise "attained national stature" under Mapes' leadership — He came to the newspaper in 1908 and rose to ownership by 1931.

In 1918, Waco-based newspapermen Charles E. Marsh and E.S. Fentress purchased the crosstown competitor Beaumont Journal. Buying two other nearby papers (the weekly Port Arthur News and the daily Orange Leader), the pair boosted the Journal circulation and eventually Hobby bought the Journal.

Jefferson-Pilot bought the Enterprise and Journal in 1970. Operating separately under the same company for many years, the Enterprise and Journal merged in 1983. The Hearst Corporation acquired the Enterprise from the Jefferson-Pilot insurance company's publications arm in 1984.
