= The Herald-Times =

Newspaper in Bloomington, Indiana

- The March 27, 2011 front page of The Herald-Times
- Type: Daily newspaper
- Format: Broadsheet
- Owner: USA Today Co.
- Founder: Walter S. Bradfute
- Editor: Jill Bond
- Founded: 1877; 149 years ago as the Bloomington Telephone
- Language: English
- Headquarters: 1900 South Walnut Street; Bloomington, Indiana 47401; United States
- Circulation: 27,540 Daily; 44,197 Sunday (as of 2016)
- Website: heraldtimesonline.com

The Herald-Times is a daily newspaper serving Bloomington, Indiana, United States, and surrounding areas. The newspaper won the Blue Ribbon Daily award in 1975, 1984, 2007, and 2014, naming it the best daily newspaper in the state of Indiana in those years. The newspaper is currently owned by newspaper conglomerate USA Today Co.

== History ==
The newspaper is the current incarnation of a business started in 1877, the Bloomington Telephone, named for the new invention. In 1943, the Telephone merged with the Evening World to become the Bloomington World-Telephone. Another paper, the Bloomington Daily Herald, was started in 1947 and three years later those papers merged into the Daily Herald-Telephone.

In 1966, the Schurz family, via their company Schurz Communications, acquired the newspaper from Dagmar Riley. Scott C. Schurz served as its publisher and chief editor from 1966 to 2002. The word Daily was dropped in 1977 and the name changed to the Herald-Times in 1989 while the newspaper switched from an evening publication to a morning publication.

Starting in 1966, the newspaper produced a joint Sunday-only publication with its sister newspaper, the Times-Mail, in neighboring Bedford called the Sunday Herald-Times that was distributed to the expanded readership of both communities. In 2001, the name of the Sunday newspaper was changed to the Hoosier Times and distributed to a much larger area.

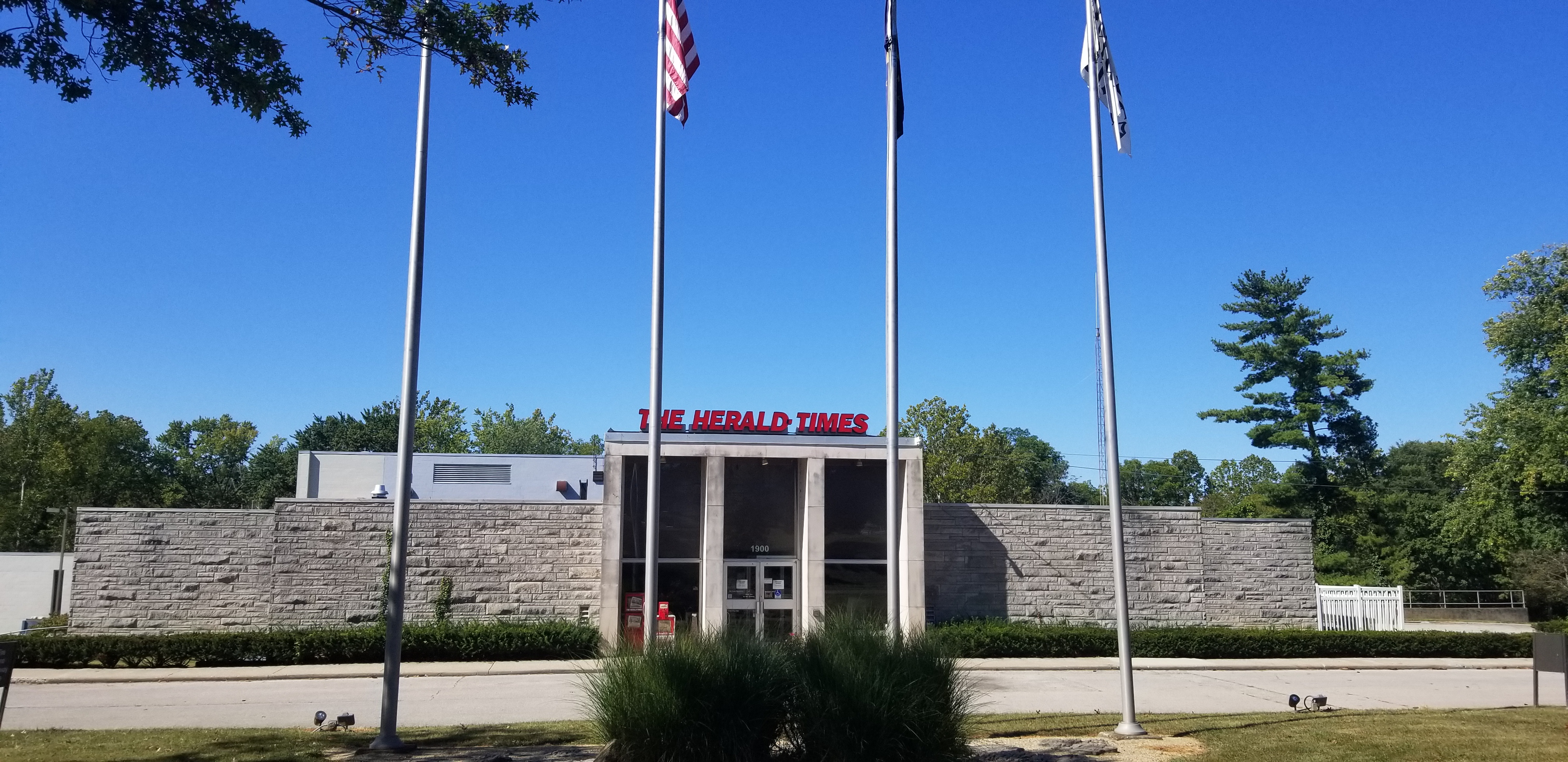
Bloomington Herald Times office

Schurz Communications exited the publishing business in January 2019 and sold the newspaper to GateHouse Media, which merged with Gannett seven months later. Its building sold to the school district in 2022.

In April 2024, the newspaper switched from carrier to postal delivery.
