= The Times Herald =

American newspaper

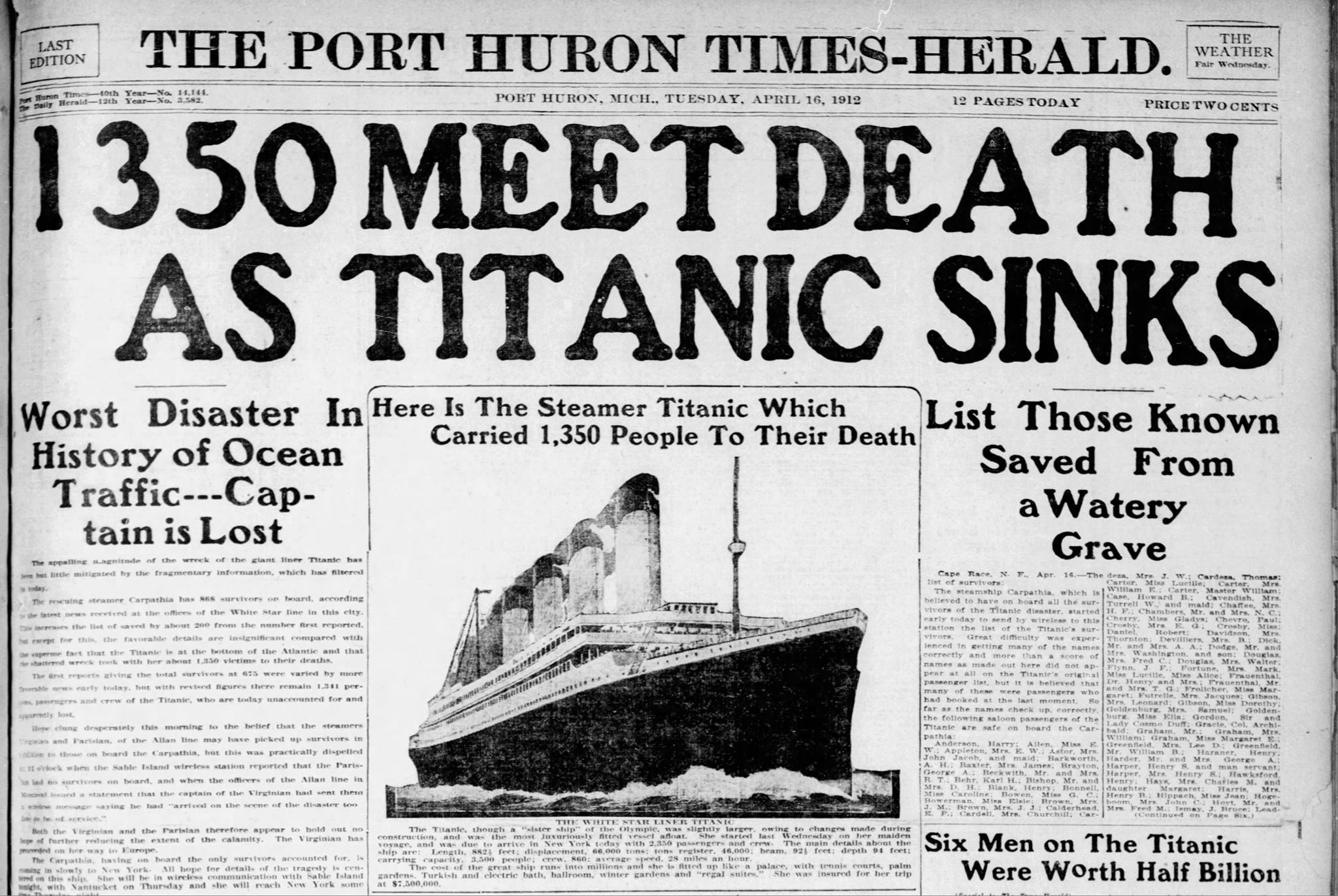
- Titanic sinking as reported by the paper April 16, 1912.
- Type: Daily newspaper
- Format: Broadsheet
- Owner: USA Today Co.
- Publisher: Timothy Gruber
- Editor: Michael Eckert
- Headquarters: 911 Military Street; Port Huron, Michigan 48060; United States
- Circulation: 16,287 Weekday; 18,103 Saturday; 26,086 Sunday
- OCLC number: 36177739
- Website: thetimesherald.com

The Times Herald is a daily newspaper in Port Huron, Michigan. The newspaper, owned by Gannett, is the only daily paper serving St. Clair County, Michigan as well as parts of Sanilac and Lapeer counties.

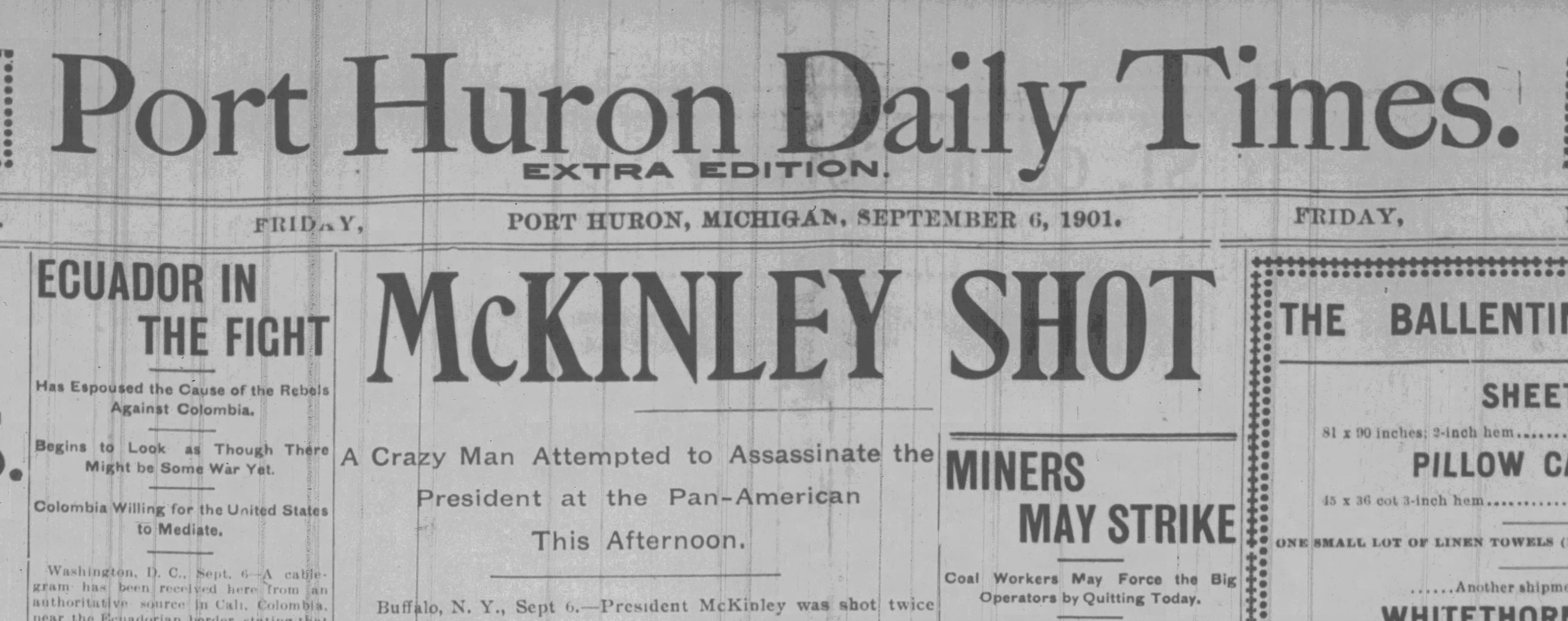
Coverpage of the Daily Times, September 6, 1901, announcing the death of William McKinley

The Times Herald's history can be dated back to 1869 with the founding of the Port Huron Times. The Daily Herald, another Port Huron newspaper, was founded in 1900. The two merged and began issuing a single issue, the Port Huron Times Herald, on April 4, 1910. The paper was purchased by Gannett in 1970.

The Times Herald was the owner of one of Port Huron's early radio stations. In December 1947, WTTH was launched on AM 1360 and moved to AM 1380 in 1949. The call letters stood for The Times Herald. The Times Herald, like many community newspapers of the era, had to divest the station due to Federal Communications Commission media ownership requirements. The Times Herald sold the station to Enterform in 1967 which was then followed by a call sign change to WPHM.

The Times-Herald's longtime headquarters were in the 900 block of 6th Street in Port Huron, at the corner of Water and 6th. This also served as the WTTH studios. In 1980, the paper moved a block east to 911 Military Street. The 6th street location was demolished and is currently used as a parking lot. The Military street building served as the paper's offices, newsroom, and printing facility for the next three decades. In 2011, The Times Herald's printing was consolidated with sister paper Lansing State Journal. Many administrative and advertising duties have also been consolidated with other Gannett properties. With the Military street building now oversized for The Times Herald, the building was sold to Michigan Mutual Mortgage in 2014. The paper continues to rent space inside their former building.

== Notable staff ==
D'Alton Corry Coleman was an editor for the Port Huron Times circa 1898, and later became president of the Canadian Pacific Railway.

== History ==
It started as the weekly The Port Huron Times in 1869 and expanded to 6 issues per week by 1872. Later it merged with the Daily Herald and became Port Huron Times Herald in 1910. It changed its name the Times Herald in 1970 and was purchased by Gannett in 1970.
