= The State Journal-Register =

Newspaper in Springfield, Illinois, US

- The July 27, 2005, front page of The State Journal-Register
- Type: Daily newspaper
- Format: Broadsheet
- Owner: USA Today Co.
- Editor: Leisa Richardson
- General manager: Eugene Jackson
- Founded: 1831; 195 years ago (as Sangamo Journal)
- Headquarters: 421 South Grand Ave. W., Suite 1A; Springfield, Illinois 62704, United States
- Circulation: 18,590 Daily; 23,925 Sunday (as of 2018)
- Website: sj-r.com

The State Journal-Register is the only local daily newspaper for Springfield, Illinois, and its surrounding area.

== History ==
The newspaper was founded in 1831 as the Sangamo Journal by William Bailhache and Edward Baker, and describes itself as "the oldest newspaper in Illinois". As such, it and its editor, Edward L. Baker, supported the political career of the Springfield-based Abraham Lincoln in the years before the American Civil War; in fact, it was in the Journal's office that Lincoln and his friends waited for the telegraphic news from Chicago to find out who would be the Republican presidential nominee in 1860. Later in publication, the name was changed to Illinois State Journal. The cover-price is $2 daily, $4.50 on Sunday.

Copley Press bought the State Journal in 1927. In 1942, it bought Springfield's afternoon paper, the Illinois State Register. For years, the two papers maintained separate editorial stances, with the State Journal tilting Republican and the State Register tilting Democratic. The two papers merged in 1974 as The State Journal-Register.

Fairport, New York–based GateHouse Media bought The State Journal-Register, along with most of Copley's other Midwestern titles, in 2007. In November 2019, GateHouse was merged with Gannett, forming the largest newspaper chain in the U.S.

Since the change in ownership, the paper has downsized its staff, leading to internal controversy and at least one editor resigning in protest. In 2022, the paper announced it would stop printing its Saturday edition.
