= Journal Star (Peoria, Illinois) =

Main newspaper in Peoria, Illinois

- July 27, 2005 front page
- Type: Daily newspaper (morning)
- Format: Broadsheet
- Owner: USA Today Co.
- Publisher: Eugene Jackson
- Editor: Romando Dixson
- Founded: December 17, 1855 (Peoria Daily Transcript); 1954 (merger of Journal-Transcript and Star)
- Language: English
- Headquarters: 1 News Plaza; Peoria, Illinois 61643; United States
- Circulation: 31,186 (as of 2018)
- ISSN: 2688-2574
- OCLC number: 8807680
- Website: pjstar.com

The Journal Star is the major daily newspaper for Peoria, Illinois, and surrounding area. First owned locally, then employee-owned, it is currently owned by USA Today Co.

== History ==
The oldest ancestor of the Journal Star, the Peoria Daily Transcript, was founded by N.C. Nason and first published on December 17, 1855. The Peoria Journal was founded as an afternoon paper by Eugene F. Baldwin the former editor of the Daily Transcript, and J. B. Barnes, and first published on December 3, 1877. The initial circulation was 1,700; one month later, it was 4,100. Henry Means Pindell started the Peoria Herald in 1889; he soon bought out the Daily Transcript, forming the Herald-Transcript. Baldwin, who had since left the Journal, started the Peoria Star, with Charles M. Powell on November 7, 1897. Pindell bought the Journal in 1900, sold the Herald-Transcript in 1902, and, after that newspaper had become the Transcript, bought it back in 1916 and merged it with the Journal, creating the Peoria Journal-Transcript, with the Transcript in the morning and the Journal in the afternoon.

In 1944, the Journal and Transcript and their rival Star combined presses as Peoria Newspapers Inc. with the Star as a morning paper and the Journal-Transcript as an afternoon paper, but retained their competition in journalism until 1954, when a full merger was agreed to. Once the agreement was reached, both the morning and afternoon papers immediately changed their names to the Journal Star. To hold the merged newspaper, the current newspaper headquarters were built near War Memorial Drive (U.S. Route 150) and the McClugage Bridge; the first edition from the new presses was on November 14, 1955.

During a newspaper strike in 1958, members of the Newspaper Guild printed a temporary paper, The Peoria Citizen.

In the 1980 presidential election, the Journal Star endorsed Libertarian candidate Ed Clark.

Between 1984 and 1990, the Journal Star Employee Stock Ownership Plan bought about 83 percent of the company, making it effectively employee-owned. The company also bought the Galesburg Register-Mail of Galesburg, Illinois, in 1989. However, the success for the employees had the opposite effect for the company itself, as it had to buy back stock of large numbers of early retirees. The paper was sold to Copley Press, owned by Helen Copley, in 1996; Copley also owned the downstate Illinois papers the State Journal-Register in Springfield, Illinois and the Lincoln Courier.

When Copley purchased the paper in 1996, the daily circulation was 75,000+. According to a Knight Foundation report in 2005, the Journal Star circulation was 65,126. The Journal Star was the highest-circulation newspaper in downstate Illinois and the fourth-highest circulation Illinois newspaper. As of September 2006, the Journal Star was the 136th-largest newspaper in the United States. In 2010, the circulation was 66,720, but dropped to 15,194 in 2021.

In 2007, the paper was sold to Fairport, New York–based GateHouse Media. In August 2019, the parent company of GateHouse, New Media Investment Group, acquired Gannett Co. New Media Investment Group and GateHouse Media merged under the Gannett brand name.

In March 2022, the Journal Star ended its Saturday print edition.

In October 2023, the Journal Star announced it will cease carrier delivery and transition to U.S. Postal Service delivery starting on November 13.
