= Midland Daily News =

Newspaper in Midland, Michigan, US

- Type: Daily newspaper
- Format: Broadsheet
- Owner: Hearst Communications
- Editor: Dave Clark
- Founded: 1937; 89 years ago
- Headquarters: Midland, Michigan, U.S.
- Circulation: 5,115 (as of 2022)
- Website: ourmidland.com

The Midland Daily News is a daily newspaper which serves Midland County, Michigan. The offices for the paper are located at 219 East Main Street in downtown Midland; the paper is widely circulated around Midland County.

The newspaper also prints the school newspaper for Herbert Henry Dow High School, The Update. The Daily News is the last daily newspaper in the Tri-Cities left with a regular print schedule, since the Bay City Times and Saginaw News cut back their print editions to three times a week in June 2009. It is published six days a week, with a weekend edition.

== History ==
The paper can trace its lineage to the 1858 founding of the Midland Sentinel, which after a number of ownership and name changes became the Midland Republican in 1881. In 1937, Republican publisher Philip T. Rich founded the Midland Daily News as a successor to the weekly Republican. In 1968, Rich sold the paper to Lindsay-Schaub Newspapers, a company based in Decatur, Illinois. In 1979, Lee Enterprises purchased the Daily News along with other Lindsay-Schaub papers, then immediately resold the paper to the Hearst Corporation.

== Awards ==
- AP News Member of the Year (from Michigan Associated Press)
- Best Circulation Promotion (from The Newspaper Association of America)
- Best Local Advertising Campaign (from The Newspaper Association of America)
