= List of newspapers in New Mexico =

This is a list of newspapers in New Mexico.

== Newspapers of record ==
The three newspapers of record for New Mexico are:

Newspaper	Founding date	Headquarters
Albuquerque Journal	1880	Albuquerque
The Santa Fe New Mexican	1849	Santa Fe
Las Cruces Sun-News	1881	Las Cruces

== Regional papers ==
- Alamogordo Daily News - Alamogordo
- Artesia Daily Press - Artesia
- Carlsbad Current-Argus - Carlsbad
- Catron Courier - Pie Town
- Cibola County Beacon - Grants
- Cloudcroft Mountain Weekly - Cloudcroft
- El Defensor-Chieftain - Socorro
- Deming Headlight - Deming
- The Eastern New Mexico News - Clovis
- Gallup Sun - Gallup
- Guadalupe County Communicator - Santa Rosa
- Hobbs News-Sun - Hobbs
- Las Cruces Bulletin - Las Cruces
- Las Vegas Optic - Las Vegas
- Lea County Tribune - Hobbs
- Los Alamos Daily Post - Los Alamos
- Lovington Daily Leader - Lovington
- Mountain Mail - Socorro
- Mountain Times - Timberon
- Mountain View Telegraph - Moriarty
- New Mexico Business Weekly - Albuquerque
- Northern New Mexico Tribune - Chama
- Quay County Sun - Tucumcari
- Questa Del Rio News - Questa
- Raton Range - Raton
- Rio Grande Sun - Española
- Rio Rancho Observer - Rio Rancho
- Roswell Daily Record - Roswell
- Ruidoso News - Ruidoso
- San Juan Sun - Farmington
- Sangre de Christo Chronicle - Angel Fire
- Santa Fe Reporter - Santa Fe
- Santa Fe Times - Santa Fe
- Sierra County Sentinel - Truth or Consequences
- Silver City Daily Press - Silver City
- Silver City Sun-News - Silver City
- The Edgewood Independent - Edgewood
- The Taos News - Taos
- Tri-City Record - Farmington
- Union County Leader - Clayton
- Valencia County News-Bulletin - Belen

== Defunct ==
- Gallup Herald - Gallup
- Gallup Independent - Gallup
- Los Alamos Monitor - Los Alamos
- Weekly Alibi - Albuquerque

== See also ==
Comprehensive

- Lists of newspapers
- List of newspapers in the United States

Frequency

- List of free daily newspapers in the United States
- List of weekly newspapers in the United States

Circulation

- List of international newspapers originating in the United States
- List of national newspapers in the United States
- List of newspapers in the United States by circulation
- List of newspapers serving cities over 100,000 in the United States

Foreign language

- List of French-language newspapers published in the United States
- List of German-language newspapers published in the United States
- List of Spanish-language newspapers published in the United States

Specialty

- List of African-American newspapers in the United States
- List of alternative weekly newspapers in the United States
- List of business newspapers in the United States
- List of family-owned newspapers in the United States
- List of Jewish newspapers in the United States
- List of LGBTQ periodicals in the United States
- List of student newspapers in the United States
- List of supermarket tabloids in the United States
- List of underground press in the United States

Other

- List of defunct newspapers of the United States
