= Newspaper endorsements for John McCain in the 2008 United States presidential election =

During the 2008 United States presidential election, newspapers, magazines, and other publications made general election endorsements. As of November 4, 2008, Barack Obama had received more than twice as many publication endorsements as John McCain; in terms of circulation, the ratio was more than 3 to 1, according to the detailed tables below. In summary:

Summary of Endorsements (with circulation) as of November 4, 2008
	McCain
	pubs.	circ.
Daily Newspapers	180	11,917,481
Weekly Newspapers	32	333,392
College Newspapers	2	16,479
Magazines and other publications	1	178,780
Total	215	12,446,132
Party Switches	11

According to Editor & Publisher magazine, as of November 3, 2008, there was 273 newspapers endorsing Barack Obama compared to 172 for John McCain. By comparison, the magazine reported that before election day in 2004, John Kerry received 213 endorsements compared to 205 for George W. Bush.

UWIRE, in its Presidential Scorecard, reported that Barack Obama led John McCain by 86 to 2 in college newspaper endorsements, as of November 4.

The Association of Alternative Newsmedia reported that Barack Obama led John McCain by 57 to 0 in endorsements among its 123 member newspapers as of October 31, 2008.

For a full list of newspapers that have endorsed Barack Obama, see Newspaper endorsements for Barack Obama in the 2008 United States presidential election.

For a summary of endorsements and a list of newspapers that have chosen not to endorse a candidate, see Newspaper endorsements in the 2008 United States presidential election.

== John McCain ==
=== Daily general circulation newspapers for McCain ===
Newspaper	Largest Reported Circulation	Paid or Free	State	2004 endorsement
New York Post	702,488	Paid	New York	Bush
The Baltimore Examiner	250,285	Free	Maryland	New since 2004
The Washington Examiner	260,950	Free	District of Columbia	New since 2004
The San Francisco Examiner	200,000	Free	California	Bush
The Pueblo Chieftain	50,243	Paid	Colorado	Bush
Boston Herald	182,350	Paid	Massachusetts	Bush
The Lowell Sun	50,245	Paid	Massachusetts	Bush
The Daily Sentinel (Grand Junction)	33,294	Paid	Colorado	Bush
Napa Valley Register	16,993	Paid	California	Bush
Foster’s Daily Democrat (Dover)	27,000	Paid	New Hampshire	Bush
The Spokesman-Review	113,081	Paid	Washington	Bush
New Hampshire Union Leader (Manchester)	73,550	Paid	New Hampshire	Bush
The Courier (Findlay)	22,000	Paid	Ohio	Bush
Amarillo Globe News	53,773	Paid	Texas	Bush
Wheeling News-Register	34,911	Paid	West Virginia	Bush
The Tampa Tribune	220,522	Paid	Florida	No Endorsement
The Dallas Morning News	520,215	Paid	Texas	Bush
Savannah Morning News	58,939	Paid	Georgia	Bush
The Columbus Dispatch	334,422	Paid	Ohio	Bush
The Morning Journal (Lorain)	27,248	Paid	Ohio	
San Antonio Express-News	315,959	Paid	Texas	Bush
Las Vegas Review-Journal	199,602	Paid	Nevada	Bush
The Bakersfield Californian	68,825	Paid	California	Bush
The San Diego Union-Tribune	355,537	Paid	California	Bush
Daily Press (Newport News)	103,308	Paid	Virginia	Kerry
Riverside Press-Enterprise	172,730	Paid	California	Bush
The Bradenton Herald	54,210	Paid	Florida	Kerry
The Jackson Sun	36,494	Paid	Tennessee	Kerry
Fargo Forum	58,277	Paid	North Dakota	Bush
Beaumont Enterprise	51,342	Paid	Texas	Bush
Corpus Christi Caller-Times	73,746	Paid	Texas	Kerry
Winchester Star	23,946	Paid	Virginia	Bush
Lubbock Avalanche-Journal	55,484	Paid	Texas	Bush
The Journal (New Ulm)	8,555	Paid	Minnesota	Bush
Bend Bulletin	33,754	Paid	Oregon	Bush
Clarksville Leaf-Chronicle	22,438	Paid	Tennessee	Bush
Roswell Daily Record	12,293	Paid	New Mexico	--
Fort Dodge Messenger	18,242	Paid	Iowa	Bush
Chambersburg Public Opinion	18,001	Paid	Pennsylvania	No Endorsement
Lewistown Sentinel	13,069	Paid	Pennsylvania	Bush
Chattanooga Free Press	95,039	Paid	Tennessee	Bush
Longmont Times-Call	22,900	Paid	Colorado	Bush
Palatka Daily News	14,508	Paid	Florida	--
Bartlesville Examiner-Enterprise	22,000	Paid	Oklahoma	--
Tyler Morning Telegraph	40,701	Paid	Texas	--
The Detroit News	188,171	Paid	Michigan	No Endorsement
Torrington Register-Citizen	8,217	Paid	Connecticut	Bush
Cape Coral Daily Breeze	38,500	Paid	Florida	--
Lancaster New Era	84,408	Paid	Pennsylvania	--
The State (Columbia)	128,564	Paid	South Carolina	Bush
Mitchell Daily Republic	12,501	Paid	South Dakota	Bush
The Cincinnati Enquirer	279,825	Paid	Ohio	Bush
The Arizona Republic (Phoenix)	515,523	Paid	Arizona	Bush
The Green Bay Press-Gazette	76,821	Paid	Wisconsin	Bush
Kerrville Daily Times	12,129	Paid	Texas	--
McCook Daily Gazette	6,065	Paid	Nebraska	Bush
Richmond Times-Dispatch	205,895	Paid	Virginia	Bush
The Eagle-Tribune (Lawrence)	47,060	Paid	Massachusetts	Bush
Grand Rapids Press	177,026	Paid	Michigan	Bush
The Galveston County Daily News	28,758	Paid	Texas	--
The Oklahoman (Oklahoma City)	262,150	Paid	Oklahoma	Bush
The Desert Sun (Palm Springs)	57,383	Paid	California	Bush
Lincoln Journal Star	78,350	Paid	Nebraska	Bush
The News Virginian (Waynesboro)	7,478	Paid	Virginia	--
The Parkersburg News and Sentinel	29,838	Paid	West Virginia	Bush
The Weirton Daily Times	5,345	Paid	West Virginia	--
North County Times (Escondido)	88,677	Paid	California	--
The Bulletin (Philadelphia)	100,000	Free	Pennsylvania	Relaunched 2006
Sioux Falls Argus Leader	65,709	Paid	South Dakota	Bush
Sioux City Journal	42,354	Paid	Iowa	Bush
Birmingham News	170,747	Paid	Alabama	Bush
Elko Daily Free Press	7,280	Paid	Nevada	Bush
Lewiston Sun Journal	36,500	Paid	Maine	Bush
Omaha World Herald	219,795	Paid	Nebraska	Bush
Mobile Press Register	112,761	Paid	Alabama	Bush
Champaign-Urbana News-Gazette	45,030	Paid	Illinois	Bush
Northwest Herald (Crystal Lake)	38,865	Paid	Illinois	Bush
The Greenville News	108,568	Paid	South Carolina	Bush
Winter Haven News Chief	9,644	Paid	Florida	--
News and Advance (Lynchburg)	39,489	Paid	Virginia	Bush
Lawrence Journal World	19,712	Paid	Kansas	--
The Washington Times	102,258	Paid	District of Columbia	Bush
Knoxville News Sentinel	147,939	Paid	Tennessee	Bush
Southwest Times Record (Fort Smith)	43,384	Paid	Arkansas	Bush
The Albany Herald	26,135	Paid	Georgia	Bush
Marietta Daily Journal	17,284	Paid	Georgia	--
Twin Falls Times-News	23,577	Paid	Idaho	Bush
Marshalltown Times-Republican	9,875	Paid	Iowa	--
Jackson Citizen Patriot	34,812	Paid	Michigan	Bush
The Oakland Press (Pontiac)	76,937	Paid	Michigan	Bush
Eagle Times (Claremont)	7,909	Paid	New Hampshire	--
The News-Herald (Willoughby)	44,322	Paid	Ohio	Bush
The Herald-Zeitung (New Braunfels)	9,230	Paid	Texas	--
Wichita Falls Times Record News	31,196	Paid	Texas	No Endorsement
The Daily News Record (Harrisonburg)	30,908	Paid	Virginia	Bush
The Centralia Chronicle	15,000	Paid	Washington	Bush
Beloit Daily News	15,455	Paid	Wisconsin	Bush
Connecticut Post (Bridgeport)	85,032	Paid	Connecticut	Bush
Casa Grande Dispatch	9,358	Paid	Arizona	--
Winston-Salem Journal	92,360	Paid	North Carolina	No Endorsement
Eureka Reporter	24,000	Free	California	--
Conroe Courier	11,528	Paid	Texas	--
Paris News	12,300	Paid	Texas	--
The Gadsden Times	20,034	Paid	Alabama	Bush
Daily Jefferson County Union (Fort Atkinson)	8,630	Paid	Wisconsin	--
Culpeper Star Exponent	7,159	Paid	Virginia	--
Silver City Daily Press	8,172	Paid	New Mexico	--
The Advocate-Messenger (Danville)	12,500	Paid	Kentucky	--
The Daily Mining Gazette (Houghton)	8,997	Paid	Michigan	Bush
Macomb Daily (Mount Clemens)	57,710	Paid	Michigan	Bush
Bemidji Pioneer	11,200	Paid	Minnesota	Bush
Escanaba Daily Press	8,497	Paid	Michigan	Bush
The Mining Journal (Marquette)	16,207	Paid	Michigan	--
Grants Pass Daily Courier	15,680	Paid	Oregon	Bush
Charleston Daily Mail	21,055	Paid	West Virginia	Bush
The Journal (Martinsburg)	17,914	Paid	West Virginia	--
The Inter-Mountain (Elkins)	11,096	Paid	West Virginia	--
Bristol Herald Courier	36,892	Paid	Virginia	Bush
Springfield Republican	115,936	Paid	Massachusetts	Kerry
Juneau Empire	6,500	Paid	Alaska	--
Williamsport Sun Gazette	30,419	Paid	Pennsylvania	--
Thomasville Times Enterprise	8,971	Paid	Georgia	--
Greenwich Time	10,456	Paid	Connecticut	--
Stamford Advocate	23,250	Paid	Connecticut	Kerry
The Marion Star	11,485	Paid	Ohio	--
Cedar Rapids Gazette	71,282	Paid	Iowa	Bush
The Item (Sumter)	21,578	Paid	South Carolina	Bush
Tulsa World	119,627	Paid	Oklahoma	Bush
Arkansas Democrat-Gazette (Little Rock)	270,477	Paid	Arkansas	Bush
Waterbury Republican-American	56,677	Paid	Connecticut	Bush
Minot Daily News	21,500	Paid	North Dakota	Bush
Pittsburgh Tribune Review (Greensburg)	191,838	Paid	Pennsylvania	Bush
The Southern Illinoisan (Carbondale)	36,743	Paid	Illinois	Bush
Albuquerque Journal	134,110	Paid	New Mexico	Bush
Rapid City Journal	32,638	Paid	South Dakota	Bush
Grand Island Independent	21,431	Paid	Nebraska	Bush
Duluth News Tribune	62,000	Paid	Minnesota	Kerry
West Central Tribune	18,550	Paid	Minnesota	--
Worthington Daily Globe	9,600	Paid	Minnesota	--
Jamestown Sun	6,000	Paid	North Dakota	--
Grand Forks Herald	29,279	Paid	North Dakota	Kerry
Red Wing Republican Eagle	5,814	Paid	Minnesota	--
Hickory Daily Record	25,734	Paid	North Carolina	--
El Paso Times	107,278	Paid	Texas	Bush
Vicksburg Post	15,000	Paid	Mississippi	--
The Trentonian	38,504	Paid	New Jersey	Bush
Northwest Indiana Times (Munster)	91,763	Paid	Indiana	--
The Post and Courier (Charleston)	105,033	Paid	South Carolina	Bush
Opelika Auburn News	15,211	Paid	Alabama	--
Clanton Advertiser	4,000	Paid	Alabama	--
Demopolis Times	3,040	Paid	Alabama	--
Dothan Eagle	33,994	Paid	Alabama	--
Chico Enterprise Record	31,207	Paid	California	--
Ridgecrest Daily Independent	6,800	Paid	California	--
Vallejo Times Herald	16,710	Paid	California	Kerry
Bismarck Tribune	30,730	Paid	North Dakota	Kerry
Tiffin Advertiser-Tribune	9,549	Paid	Ohio	--
Charlottesville Daily Progress	29,583	Paid	Virginia	--
Newton Daily News	5,809	Paid	Iowa	--
Dekalb Daily Chronicle	12,250	Paid	Illinois	--
Creston News Advertiser	5,589	Paid	Iowa	--
Kane County Chronicle (Geneva)	12,600	Paid	Illinois	--
Morris Daily Herald	6,200	Paid	Illinois	--
Sauk Valley Telegraph and Daily Gazette	21,430	Paid	Illinois	--
The Daily Courier (Prescott)	18,361	Paid	Arizona	--
Augusta Chronicle	79,397	Paid	Georgia	Bush
Ashland Daily Independent	16,777	Paid	Kentucky	Bush
Bowling Green Daily News	24,549	Paid	Kentucky	Bush
International Falls Daily Journal	4,000	Paid	Minnesota	--
Jefferson City News Tribune	21,857	Paid	Missouri	--
Marietta Times	11,756	Paid	Ohio	--
Warren Tribune Chronicle	34,108	Paid	Ohio	--
Enid News & Eagle	16,652	Paid	Oklahoma	Bush
Albany Democrat-Herald	17,586	Paid	Oregon	Bush
Baker City Herald	3,000	Paid	Oregon	--
Warren Times-Observer	9,916	Paid	Pennsylvania	--
The Tribune-Democrat (Johnstown)	40,662	Paid	Pennsylvania	--
Danville Register and Bee	21,897	Paid	Virginia	Bush
Wheeling Intelligencer	27,576	Paid	West Virginia	Bush
Ontario Argus Observer	8,400	Paid	Oregon	Bush
Alexandria Town Talk	33,157	Paid	Louisiana	--
St. Joseph News-Press	34,458	Paid	Missouri	Bush
Steubenville Herald-Star	15,148	Paid	Ohio	--
The News-Sentinel (Fort Wayne)	23,312	Paid	Indiana	--

=== Weekly general circulation newspapers for McCain ===
Newspaper	Largest Reported Circulation	Paid or Free	State	2004 endorsement
Wharton Journal Spectator (2x-weekly)	4,307	Paid	Texas	--
River Falls Journal	4,850	Paid	Wisconsin	--
The Jewish Press	125,000	Paid	New York	--
Rappahannock News Times	2,945	Paid	Virginia	Kerry
Garden City News	8,130	Paid	New York	--
Lampasas Dispatch Record	3,382	Paid	Texas	--
White Mountain Independent (Show Low) (2x-weekly)	10,200	Paid	Arizona	--
Lake County Journals	50,000 (combined)	Paid/Free	Illinois	--
Mat-Su Valley Frontiersman (Wasilla) (3x-weekly)	6,000	Paid	Alaska	--
Mountain Valley News (Cedaredge)	2,000	Paid	Colorado	--
Inside Tucson Business	6,925	Paid	Arizona	--
Concordia Sentinel (Ferriday)	4,200	Paid	Louisiana	--
Tulsa Beacon	3,000	Paid	Oklahoma	--
Sand Mountain Reporter (Albertville) (3x-weekly)	10,500	Paid	Alabama	--
Lake Geneva Regional News	6,000	Paid	Wisconsin	--
Detroit Lakes Tribune	4,500	Paid	Minnesota	--
Alexandria Echo Press (2x-weekly)	9,763	Paid	Minnesota	--
Hudson Star-Observer	7,335	Paid	Minnesota	--
Lake Elmo Leader	2,200	Paid	Minnesota	--
Morris Sun Tribune (2x-weekly)	2,946	Paid	Minnesota	--
New Richmond News	5,642	Paid	Wisconsin	--
Park Rapids Enterprise (2x-weekly)	5,723	Paid	Minnesota	--
Pierce County Herald (Ellsworth)	4,376	Paid	Wisconsin	--
Stillwater Courier	1,757	Paid	Minnesota	--
Woodbury Bulletin	7,811	Paid	Minnesota	--
Paradise Post (3x-weekly)	8,500	Paid	California	--
Woodburn Independent	4,256	Paid	Oregon	--
Bureau County Republican (Princeton) (3x-weekly)	7,827	Paid	Illinois	--
Coweta American	3,000	Paid	Georgia	--
Eufaula Tribune (2x-weekly)	5,500	Paid	Alabama	--
Hillsboro Argus (2x-weekly)	7,954	Paid	Oregon	--
Wetumpka Herald	5,363	Paid	Alabama	--
Idaho County Free Press	3,766	Paid	Idaho	--
Chicago Jewish Star	17,500	Paid	Illinois	--

=== College and university newspapers for McCain ===
Newspaper	Institution	Largest Reported Circulation	Frequency	State	2004 endorsement
Daily Mississippian	University of Mississippi	11,979	Daily	Mississippi	--
Mesa State Criterion	Mesa State College	4,500	Weekly	Colorado	--

=== Magazines and other publications for McCain ===
Publication	Circulation
National Review	178,780

== See also ==
- Newspaper endorsements in the United States presidential primaries
