= Valda Cooper =

American journalist and reporter

- Born: Valda Margaret Cooper LavenderValda Cooper; November 15, 1915; Melbourne, Australia
- Died: April 12, 2008; Farmington, New Mexico
- Occupation(s): Journalist and reporter

Valda Margaret Cooper LavenderValda Cooper (November 15, 1915 – April 12, 2008) was an American journalist and reporter. She was considered to be one of the first women to report on hard news for the Associated Press. She was also reported for a number of publications in New Mexico, including the Farmington Daily Times. Cooper also served as the managing editor of the Farmington Daily Times during her 40-year reporting career.

Cooper was once quoted as proclaiming, "I've got printer's ink in my veins."

== Early life ==
Valda Cooper was born in Melbourne, Australia, on November 15, 1915. She moved to the United States from Australia with her parents when she was just an infant.

=== Career ===
Cooper began her career in newspaper journalism at the Borger Herald in Borger, Texas. She worked as a staff member at the Borger Herald for nine years before joining the Associated Press' Bureau in Santa Fe, New Mexico, in 1943. She was the first woman to work at the New Mexican AP staff. There she covered the political proceedings at the New Mexico State Legislature, including the New Mexico Senate, and the New Mexico State Capitol as a night editor for the AP.

In 1945, Cooper married United States Marines Staff Sergeant Dave Cooper, who was originally from Lansdowne, Pennsylvania, while the New Mexican State Legislature was in session. The State Leigislature actually adjourned early for the evening so the couple could enjoy a honeymoon without worrying about reporting. Together the couple would later have two children - Kay and Cy Cooper.

Cooper also began working for the Santa Fe New Mexican at the time. She won her first E.H. Shaffer award from the New Mexico Press Association while working for the paper. (The award is named in honor of former Albuquerque Journal editor, E.H. Shaffer.)

Cooper's husband, Dave Cooper, received his honorable discharge from the Marines, where he worked as a recruiting officer. He briefly co-owned a sporting goods store in Santa Fe, before selling it. The couple moved to Durango, Colorado, before settling in Farmington, New Mexico, in 1950 due to his job transfer by the Southern Union Gas Company. The couple remained together until Dave Cooper's death in 1985. Cooper later remarried to Dr. Harold Lavender in 1999. Valda and Harold lived in both Farmington and Albuquerque during their marriage. They remained together until Harold Lavender died in 2005.

Cooper joined the Farmington Daily Times in 1953 after moving to the area because of her husband's job transfer. She remained at the Farmington Daily Times for 26 years, including 14 years in which she served as the newspaper's managing editor. By serving in this position, Cooper became the first woman managing editor of any daily newspaper in New Mexico.

Cooper became head of a number of journalism related organizations during her long career. She served as president of the New Mexico Press Association, the first female president of the New Mexico Associated Press Managing Editors Association and the president of the New Mexico Press Women.

Cooper retired from full-time reporting in 1980. However, she remained a successful freelance writer, whose works were often published in New Mexico Magazine. She also mentored young reporters in Farmington, New Mexico from 1981 until 1985.

Cooper also served on the boards of many New Mexican cultural, medical and educational organizations. She served for six years on the board of directors for the San Juan Medical Center. She also held the position of chairman of the Fine Arts Advisory Committee of San Juan College and on the board of the Anasazi, the Ancient Ones Foundation and the San Juan College Foundation's Hall of Fame. Additionally, Cooper was a member of the associations of the Farmington Museum, the Aztec Museum and the Salmon Ruins Museum.

Cooper was a co-founder of the San Juan Community Concert Association as well as the Farmington chapter of the Beta Sigma Phi sorority. She served on the board of the San Juan Community Concert Association for 41 years from its inception until her retirement from the board in 1995. Cooper acted as the charter secretary for the San Juan College Foundation and on the school's Independence Election Committee when San Juan College officially separated from New Mexico State University.

== Death ==
Cooper lived at a nursing home in Farmington during her final years. She kept a computer in her room in order to write potential stories and read the news. Cooper died in her sleep on April 12, 2008, at the age of 92 at her nursing home in Farmington, New Mexico. She was survived by her two children and four grandchildren.

== Awards and recognitions ==
Valda Cooper received numerous awards and recognitions throughout her career. Many of Cooper's awards were for her writing accomplishments. She was the first woman to receive the New Mexico Sigma Delta Chi Journalism Fraternity's Dan Burrows Memorial Award, which is named for the former Albuquerque Tribune editor. In 1984, Cooper was named to the New Mexico Press Association Hall of Fame. Three years later, in 1987, Cooper was also named Outstanding Woman Leader at the New Mexico Governor's Regional Conference, which was held in Farmington. She also won the New Mexico Medical Society's Guy Rader Award for excellent reporting on the medical field in 1964. (Her daughter, Kay Cooper McKinney, won the same award twenty six years later.) The Farmington Chamber of Commerce Past Presidents' Committee named Cooper to its Historymakers Hall of Fame in 1995. She was named to the same Chamber of Commerce's Humanitarian of the Year award in 1986. She was also named to the San Juan College Hall of Fame in 2001.
