= Newspaper endorsements for Barack Obama in the 2008 United States presidential election =

During the 2008 United States presidential election, newspapers, magazines, and other publications made general election endorsements. As of November 4, 2008, Barack Obama had received more than twice as many publication endorsements as John McCain; in terms of circulation, the ratio was more than three to one, according to the detailed tables below:

Summary of Endorsements (with circulation) as of November 4, 2008
	Obama	
	pubs.	circ.
Daily Newspapers	296	30,580,459
Weekly Newspapers	111	3,951,905
College Newspapers	79	819,000
Magazines and other publications	10	5,226,633
Total	496	40,577,997
Party Switches	66	

According to Editor & Publisher magazine, as of November 3, 2008, there were 273 newspapers endorsing Barack Obama compared to 172 for John McCain. By comparison, the magazine reported that before election day in 2004, John Kerry received 213 endorsements compared to 205 for George W. Bush.

UWIRE, in its Presidential Scorecard, reported that Barack Obama led John McCain by 94 to 2 in college newspaper endorsements, as of November 4.

The Association of Alternative Newsweeklies reported that Barack Obama led John McCain by 57 to 0 in endorsements among its 123 member newspapers as of October 31, 2008.

For a full list of newspapers that have endorsed John McCain, see Newspaper endorsements in the United States presidential election, 2008, for John McCain.

For a list of newspapers that have chosen not to endorse a candidate, see Newspaper endorsements in the United States presidential election, 2008.

== Daily newspapers for Obama ==
Newspaper	Largest Reported Circulation	Paid or Free	State	2004 endorsement
The Seattle Times	409,231	Paid	Washington	Kerry
The Columbian (Vancouver)	50,277	Paid	Washington	Bush
The Modesto Bee	83,576	Paid	California	Kerry
San Mateo County Times	28,788	Paid	California	Kerry
Fort Wayne Journal Gazette	111,485	Paid	Indiana	Kerry
Tri Valley Herald (Pleasanton)	30,243	Paid	California	Bush
The Lufkin Daily News	13,618	Paid	Texas	Kerry
Oakland Tribune	96,535	Paid	California	Kerry
Honolulu Star-Bulletin	63,692	Paid	Hawaii	Kerry
Chattanooga Times Free Press	95,039	Paid	Tennessee	Kerry
Durango Herald	9,250	Paid	Colorado	Kerry
The Commercial Appeal (Memphis)	188,040	Paid	Tennessee	Kerry
The Standard-Times (New Bedford)	30,549	Paid	Massachusetts	Kerry
The Record (Stockton)	62,585	Paid	California	Bush
The Repository (Canton)	78,066	Paid	Ohio	Bush
San Jose Mercury News	251,851	Paid	California	Kerry
Seattle Post-Intelligencer	129,563	Paid	Washington	Kerry
The Santa Fe New Mexican	26,114	Paid	New Mexico	Kerry
The Charleston Gazette	74,556	Paid	West Virginia	Kerry
St. Louis Post-Dispatch	414,564	Paid	Missouri	Kerry
The Tennessean (Nashville)	219,044	Paid	Tennessee	Kerry
The Blade (Toledo)	147,141	Paid	Ohio	Kerry
Pittsburgh Post-Gazette	331,053	Paid	Pennsylvania	Kerry
Dayton Daily News	157,833	Paid	Ohio	Kerry
Wisconsin State Journal (Madison)	138,276	Paid	Wisconsin	Bush
The San Bernardino Sun	57,752	Paid	California	Bush
Asheville Citizen-Times	55,991	Paid	North Carolina	Kerry
The Fresno Bee	171,039	Paid	California	Kerry
The Sacramento Bee	307,480	Paid	California	Kerry
Contra Costa Times (Walnut Creek)	194,203	Paid	California	Kerry
The Monterey County Herald	30,803	Paid	California	Kerry
The Express-Times (Easton)	44,561	Paid	Pennsylvania	Bush
Springfield News-Sun	31,038	Paid	Ohio	Kerry
Muskegon Chronicle	45,583	Paid	Michigan	Kerry
The Boston Globe	525,959	Paid	Massachusetts	Kerry
The Washington Post	890,163	Paid	District of Columbia	Kerry
San Francisco Chronicle	424,603	Paid	California	Kerry
Los Angeles Times	1,101,981	Paid	California	No Endorsement
Chicago Tribune	898,703	Paid	Illinois	Bush
The Denver Post	600,026	Paid	Colorado	Bush
Chicago Sun-Times	312,274	Paid	Illinois	Kerry
The Salt Lake Tribune	143,296	Paid	Utah	Bush
The Atlanta Journal-Constitution	497,149	Paid	Georgia	Kerry
The Argus (Fremont)	26,749	Paid	California	Kerry
Daily Review (Hayward)	30,704	Paid	California	Kerry
La Opinión (Los Angeles)	114,892	Paid	California	Kerry
Santa Cruz Sentinel	23,290	Paid	California	Kerry
The Kansas City Star	345,332	Paid	Missouri	Kerry
El Diario La Prensa (New York)	53,856	Paid	New York	Kerry
Mail Tribune (Medford)	30,844	Paid	Oregon	Kerry
The Capital Times (Madison)	17,479	Paid	Wisconsin	Kerry
The Philadelphia Inquirer	630,665	Paid	Pennsylvania	Kerry
The Miami Herald	399,280	Paid	Florida	Kerry
The Oregonian (Portland)	361,988	Paid	Oregon	Kerry
New Haven Register	80,279	Paid	Connecticut	Bush
Statesman Journal (Salem)	53,101	Paid	Oregon	Kerry
Las Cruces Sun-News	24,735	Paid	New Mexico	Bush
Bangor Daily News	63,299	Paid	Maine	Kerry
The Times Record (Brunswick)	11,029	Paid	Maine	Kerry
The Daily Reflector (Greenville)	22,553	Paid	North Carolina	Kerry
Daily News (New York)	704,157	Paid	New York	Bush
Detroit Free Press	606,374	Paid	Michigan	Kerry
Houston Chronicle	632,797	Paid	Texas	Bush
The Plain Dealer (Cleveland)	428,090	Paid	Ohio	No Endorsement
Daily Herald (Arlington Heights)	143,152	Paid	Illinois	Kerry
Naples Daily News	74,553	Paid	Florida	Bush
Star-News (Wilmington)	53,746	Paid	North Carolina	Kerry
Yakima Herald-Republic	38,518	Paid	Washington	Bush
The Herald-Dispatch (Huntington)	32,105	Paid	West Virginia	Kerry
The News & Observer (Raleigh)	211,245	Paid	North Carolina	Kerry
Austin American-Statesman	206,505	Paid	Texas	Bush
The Buffalo News	260,445	Paid	New York	Kerry
Orlando Sentinel	332,030	Paid	Florida	Kerry
The Tuscaloosa News	34,606	Paid	Alabama	Kerry
Idaho Statesman (Boise)	81,939	Paid	Idaho	Kerry
Las Vegas Sun	199,356	Paid	Nevada	Kerry
Akron Beacon Journal	155,436	Paid	Ohio	Kerry
The Daytona Beach News-Journal	116,700	Paid	Florida	Kerry
Sarasota Herald-Tribune	125,644	Paid	Florida	Kerry
Daily Breeze (Torrance)	67,184	Paid	California	Bush
The Rockford Register Star	69,693	Paid	Illinois	Kerry
The Telegraph (Nashua)	34,500	Paid	New Hampshire	Kerry
Concord Monitor	23,930	Paid	New Hampshire	Kerry
The Register-Guard (Eugene)	72,278	Paid	Oregon	Kerry
The Burlington Free Press	47,566	Paid	Vermont	Kerry
Tri-City Herald (Pasco)	42,646	Paid	Washington	Kerry
Lexington Herald-Leader	135,250	Paid	Kentucky	Kerry
Los Angeles Daily News	145,164	Paid	California	Kerry
Asbury Park Press	184,095	Paid	New Jersey	Bush
Press-Telegram (Long Beach)	85,595	Paid	California	Bush
JournalNews (Hamilton)	21,705	Paid	Ohio	Bush
New Philadelphia Times Reporter	22,428	Paid	Ohio	Bush
The Eagle (Bryan/College Station)	24,210	Paid	Texas	--
The Herald-Sun (Durham)	32,845	Paid	North Carolina	No Endorsement
The Palm Beach Post	195,608	Paid	Florida	Kerry
Pasadena Star-News	29,165	Paid	California	Bush
San Gabriel Valley Tribune	41,550	Paid	California	Bush
Palladium-Item (Richmond)	19,289	Paid	Indiana	Bush
Mason City Globe	21,947	Paid	Iowa	Bush
Inland Valley Daily Bulletin (Ontario)	59,027	Paid	California	Bush
Marin Independent Journal	33,910	Paid	California	Kerry
Aspen Daily News	14,600	Free	Colorado	Kerry
Camera (Boulder)	33,124	Paid	Colorado	Kerry
The Hawk Eye (Burlington)	19,973	Paid	Iowa	Kerry
The St. Cloud Times	35,654	Paid	Minnesota	Kerry
Columbia Daily Tribune	22,478	Paid	Missouri	Kerry
The Middletown Journal	18,299	Paid	Ohio	--
The Daily Astorian	8,363	Paid	Oregon	Kerry
The Daily Item (Sunbury)	25,247	Paid	Pennsylvania	No Endorsement
The Olympian (Olympia)	38,340	Paid	Washington	Kerry
Walla Walla Union-Bulletin	15,401	Paid	Washington	Kerry
San Mateo Daily Journal	25,000	Paid	California	--
East Oregonian (Pendleton)	9,193	Paid	Oregon	Kerry
The News Journal (Wilmington)	125,244	Paid	Delaware	Kerry
The Decatur Daily	22,961	Paid	Alabama	--
The New York Times	1,476,400	Paid	New York	Kerry
Bluefield Daily Telegraph	17,476	Paid	West Virginia	Bush
Merced Sun-Star	19,585	Paid	California	Kerry
North Adams Transcript	6,827	Paid	Massachusetts	--
The Daily Star (Oneonta)	14,391	Paid	New York	Kerry
Longview News-Journal	31,863	Paid	Texas	Kerry
The News Tribune (Tacoma)	125,955	Paid	Washington	Kerry
Stevens Point Journal	11,431	Paid	Wisconsin	No Endorsement
St. Petersburg Times	432,779	Paid	Florida	Kerry
Philadelphia Daily News	107,269	Paid	Pennsylvania	Kerry
The Hartford Courant	237,933	Paid	Connecticut	Bush
Vail Daily	15,000	Free	Colorado	--
Lake County News-Sun	18,867	Paid	Illinois	Bush
Maysville Ledger Independent	9,074	Paid	Kentucky	Bush
Corvallis Gazette-Times	12,204	Paid	Oregon	--
The Charlotte Observer	264,170	Paid	North Carolina	Kerry
The Baltimore Sun	372,970	Paid	Maryland	Kerry
The Berkshire Eagle (Pittsfield)	29,838	Paid	Massachusetts	Kerry
York Daily Record	79,683	Paid	Pennsylvania	Bush
TimesDaily (Florence)	29,843	Paid	Alabama	Bush
Star Tribune (Minneapolis)	534,750	Paid	Minnesota	Kerry
Milwaukee Journal Sentinel	384,539	Paid	Wisconsin	Kerry
Anchorage Daily News	69,893	Paid	Alaska	Kerry
The Des Moines Register	222,122	Paid	Iowa	Kerry
Fort Worth Star-Telegram	289,974	Paid	Texas	Bush
The Patriot-News (Harrisburg)	140,217	Paid	Pennsylvania	No Endorsement
Democrat and Chronicle (Rochester)	199,533	Paid	New York	Kerry
Times Union (Albany)	141,064	Paid	New York	Kerry
The Ledger (Lakeland)	83,860	Paid	Florida	Bush
Reno Gazette-Journal	66,465	Paid	Nevada	Kerry
The Times-Tribune (Scranton)	70,900	Paid	Pennsylvania	No endorsement
The Pantagraph (Bloomington-Normal)	50,081	Paid	Illinois	Bush
The Star Press (Muncie)	32,589	Paid	Indiana	--
The Providence Journal	192,849	Paid	Rhode Island	Bush
The Star-Ledger (Newark)	345,130	Paid	New Jersey	Kerry
The Record (Bergen County)	195,525	Paid	New Jersey	Kerry
Lansing State Journal	76,887	Paid	Michigan	Kerry
The Day (New London)	40,670	Paid	Connecticut	Kerry
The Post-Standard (Syracuse)	158,529	Paid	New York	Bush
The Bay City Times	38,715	Paid	Michigan	Kerry
The Saginaw News	48,839	Paid	Michigan	Kerry
Gloucester County Times	25,131	Paid	New Jersey	Kerry
Ledger-Enquirer (Columbus)	51,434	Paid	Georgia	Bush
Billings Gazette	50,940	Paid	Montana	Kerry
La Crosse Tribune	40,135	Paid	Wisconsin	Kerry
Poughkeepsie Journal	43,661	Paid	New York	Bush
The Post-Star (Glens Falls)	32,977	Paid	New York	Kerry
Times Leader (Wilkes-Barre)	49,917	Paid	Pennsylvania	Kerry
The Courier-Journal (Louisville)	258,778	Paid	Kentucky	Kerry
The Times-Picayune (New Orleans)	199,647	Paid	Louisiana	No Endorsement
Quad-City Times (Davenport)	67,753	Paid	Illinois and Iowa	Kerry
The Times (Trenton)	56,449	Paid	New Jersey	Kerry
The Financial Times	151,474 (U.S. only)	Paid	Nationwide	Kerry
Courier-Post (Camden)	78,706	Paid	New Jersey	Kerry
Home News Tribune (New Brunswick)	54,170	Paid	New Jersey	--
The Vindicator (Youngstown)	75,257	Paid	Ohio	Bush
Erie Times-News	75,746	Paid	Pennsylvania	Bush
Montgomery Advertiser	50,983	Paid	Alabama	Kerry
The Portsmouth Herald/Seacoast Sunday	16,507	Paid	New Hampshire	Kerry
Portland Press Herald/Maine Sunday Telegram	99,116	Paid	Maine	Kerry
Florida Today (Melbourne)	93,604	Paid	Florida	Kerry
Farmington Daily Times	19,228	Paid	New Mexico	Bush
Kitsap Sun (Bremerton)	31,730	Paid	Washington	Kerry
Galesburg Register Mail	13,400	Paid	Illinois	--
Chippewa Herald	8,000	Paid	Wisconsin	Bush
Norwich Bulletin	25,164	Paid	Connecticut	Kerry
Brattleboro Reformer	10,581	Paid	Vermont	Kerry
Bennington Banner	7,485	Paid	Vermont	Kerry
Wenatchee World	24,409	Paid	Washington	--
San Angelo Standard-Times	28,578	Paid	Texas	--
The Keene Sentinel	12,119	Paid	New Hampshire	Kerry
The Gainesville Sun	49,179	Paid	Florida	Kerry
Pensacola News Journal	68,962	Paid	Florida	--
Santa Rosa Press Democrat	78,505	Paid	California	Kerry
Telegram & Gazette (Worcester)	96,553	Paid	Massachusetts	Kerry
The Journal News (Westchester County)	125,829	Paid	New York	Kerry
The Times (Shreveport)	62,753	Paid	Louisiana	Kerry
Observer-Reporter (Washington)	34,388	Paid	Pennsylvania	Kerry
Fort Collins Coloradoan	30,020	Paid	Colorado	Kerry
The Telegraph (Macon)	70,438	Paid	Georgia	Kerry
South Florida Sun-Sentinel (Fort Lauderdale)	303,399	Paid	Florida	Kerry
Reporter (Vacaville)	18,226	Paid	California	Bush
Dubois Courier-Express	17,000	Paid	Pennsylvania	--
Wausau Daily Herald	50,226	Paid	Wisconsin	Kerry
Ottumwa Courier	14,757	Paid	Iowa	No Endorsement
Benton County Daily Record	21,000	Paid	Arkansas	--
Tahoe Daily Tribune	18,724	Free	California	--
Lancaster Eagle Gazette	12,964	Paid	Ohio	--
Journal & Courier (Lafayette)	40,448	Paid	Indiana	Kerry
Kenosha News	26,502	Paid	Wisconsin	Kerry
The Commercial Dispatch (Columbus)	15,000	Paid	Mississippi	--
Battle Creek Enquirer	26,983	Paid	Michigan	Kerry
Livingston County Daily Press & Argus	16,049	Paid	Michigan	Kerry
Mansfield News Journal	35,000	Paid	Ohio	Bush
The Beaver County Times	44,994	Paid	Pennsylvania	Kerry
Delaware County Daily and Sunday Times	42,879	Paid	Pennsylvania	Kerry
The Herald-Standard (Uniontown)	25,898	Paid	Pennsylvania	Kerry
The Mercury (Pottstown)	22,809	Paid	Pennsylvania	Kerry
Pocono Record (Stroudsburg)	23,816	Paid	Pennsylvania	Kerry
Times West Virginian (Fairmont)	11,524	Paid	West Virginia	Kerry
The News Leader (Staunton)	19,035	Paid	Virginia	Bush
Kennebec Journal (Augusta)	16,000	Paid	Maine	Kerry
The Joplin Globe	36,000	Paid	Missouri	Bush
The Conway Daily Sun	16,100	Free	New Hampshire	No Endorsement
Hays Daily News	15,000	Paid	Kansas	--
Chicago Defender	17,000	Paid	Illinois	Kerry
Cape Cod Times	47,482	Paid	Massachusetts	Bush
SouthtownStar (Chicago)	63,105	Paid	Illinois	Kerry
Talladega Daily Home	14,000	Paid	Alabama	--
Bucyrus Telegraph-Forum	5,838	Paid	Ohio	--
Valley News (Lebanon)	16,330	Paid	New Hampshire	Kerry
Iowa City Press-Citizen	16,130	Paid	Iowa	Kerry
Sullivan Daily Times	4,300	Paid	Indiana	--
Albert Lea Tribune	8,000	Paid	Minnesota	--
The Hutchinson News	34,073	Paid	Kansas	Kerry
The Salem News	29,125	Paid	Massachusetts	--
The Daily News of Newburyport	12,262	Paid	Massachusetts	Bush
Martha's Vineyard Times	14,990	Paid	Massachusetts	--
Freeport Journal-Standard	12,330	Paid	Illinois	Bush
Daily Democrat (Woodland)	8,964	Paid	California	--
The Delphos Herald	3,795	Paid	Ohio	No Endorsement
The Star Democrat (Easton)	20,500	Paid	Maryland	Bush
Flint Journal	91,017	Paid	Michigan	Kerry
Traverse City Record-Eagle	35,240	Paid	Michigan	Kerry
The Daily Review (Towanda)	9,308	Paid	Pennsylvania	--
Muskogee Phoenix	15,844	Paid	Oklahoma	Kerry
Hoy (New York)	41,000	Paid	New York	--
Times Herald-Record (Middletown)	81,794	Paid	New York	--
Rochester Post-Bulletin	48,038	Paid	Minnesota	No Endorsement
Daily Hampshire Gazette (Northampton)	48,038	Paid	Massachusetts	--
Decatur Herald and Review	47,436	Paid	Illinois	Bush
The Marshall News Messenger	6,870	Paid	Texas	--
Whittier Daily News	15,123	Paid	California	Bush
New Castle News	16,465	Paid	Pennsylvania	--
The Anniston Star	24,671	Paid	Alabama	Kerry
The Jersey Journal	23,865	Paid	New Jersey	Kerry
Daily Tribune (Royal Oak)	9,563	Paid	Michigan	--
Winona Daily News	12,207	Paid	Minnesota	--
Marshfield News Herald	11,725	Paid	Wisconsin	No Endorsement
Ironwood Daily Globe	7,000	Paid	Michigan	Kerry
Newsday (Long Island)	433,894	Paid	New York	Kerry
Petoskey News-Review	12,000	Paid	Michigan	Kerry
Moline Dispatch	48,000	Paid	Illinois	--
Rock Island Argus	15,495	Paid	Illinois	--
Garden City Telegram	8,800	Paid	Kansas	--
The Herald Bulletin (Anderson)	22,041	Paid	Indiana	--
Aspen Times	12,500	Free	Colorado	--
Shawano Leader	22,500	Paid	Wisconsin	Bush
The Citizens' Voice (Wilkes-Barre)	33,977	Paid	Pennsylvania	Kerry
Hazleton Standard-Speaker	24,033	Paid	Pennsylvania	--
Indiana Gazette	15,241	Paid	Pennsylvania	--
Lebanon Daily News	19,345	Paid	Pennsylvania	Bush
The Enterprise (Brockton)	33,152	Paid	Massachusetts	--
Arizona Daily Star (Tucson)	147,558	Paid	Arizona	Kerry
Watertown Daily Times	36,000	Paid	New York	--
The State Journal-Register (Springfield)	57,329	Paid	Illinois	Bush
Journal Star (Peoria)	80,131	Paid	Illinois	Bush
Greenwood Commonwealth	7,058	Paid	Mississippi	--
The Clarion-Ledger (Jackson)	91,810	Paid	Mississippi	Bush
Metrowest Daily News (Framingham)	26,139	Paid	Massachusetts	Kerry
The News-Times (Danbury)	29,794	Paid	Connecticut	Bush
Daily Record (Parsippany)	33,949	Paid	New Jersey	Kerry
Post-Tribune (Merrillville)	60,732	Paid	Indiana	--
The Sheboygan Press	22,033	Paid	Wisconsin	Kerry
Selma Times-Journal	9,200	Paid	Alabama	--
Staten Island Advance	53,200	Paid	New York	Kerry
The Montana Standard (Butte)	14,625	Paid	Montana	--
Independent Record (Helena)	15,210	Paid	Montana	--
Star-Gazette (Elmira)	31,716	Paid	New York	Kerry
Casper Star-Tribune	30,745	Paid	Wyoming	Bush
Vineland Daily Journal	17,910	Paid	New Jersey	Kerry
Spartanburg Herald-Journal	49,457	Paid	South Carolina	Bush
The Independent (Massillon)	11,804	Paid	Ohio	Bush
The Herald (Sharon)	19,105	Paid	Pennsylvania	--
The Intelligencer (Doylestown)	43,977	Paid	Pennsylvania	Kerry
Sentinel & Enterprise (Fitchburg)	17,555	Paid	Massachusetts	Bush
West Plains Daily Quill	9,239	Paid	Missouri	Kerry
Courier News (Bridgewater)	29,675	Paid	New Jersey	Kerry
Niagara Gazette (Niagara Falls)	16,331	Paid	New York	--
Lockport Union-Sun & Journal	10,526	Paid	New York	--
The Daily World (Aberdeen)	13,400	Paid	Washington	--
Times-Journal (Fort Payne) (4x-weekly)	6,450	Paid	Alabama	--
Coshocton Tribune	6,171	Paid	Ohio	--
Zanesville Times Recorder	17,209	Paid	Ohio	Kerry
Bucks County Courier Times (Levittown)	57,692	Paid	Pennsylvania	Kerry
The Intelligencer (Doylestown)	43,977	Paid	Pennsylvania	Kerry
Daily Journal (Franklin)	17,132	Paid	Indiana	

== Weekly newspapers for Obama ==
Newspaper	Largest Reported Circulation	Paid or Free	State	2004 endorsement
Cincinnati CityBeat	46,636	Free	Ohio	--
The Austin Chronicle	91,576	Free	Texas	Kerry
The Stranger (Seattle)	86,652	Free	Washington	--
Willamette Week (Portland)	88,846	Free	Oregon	--
City Newspaper (Rochester)	43,884	Free	New York	--
Windsor Beacon (Ft. Collins)	2,823	--	Colorado	--
Bay Guardian (San Francisco)	118,887	Free	California	--
New York Observer	51,000	Free	New York	--
Independent Weekly (Raleigh-Durham)	43,577	Free	North Carolina	Kerry
Milford Cabinet	8,000	Paid	Massachusetts	--
El Mundo (Austin)	25,000	Free	Texas	--
The Independent (Columbia)	11,138	Paid	New York	--
The Progress (Caldwell)	7,216	Paid	New Jersey	--
Indian Country Today	12,780	Free	Nationwide	--
The Arkansas Times (Little Rock)	34,000	Free	Arkansas	Kerry
Santa Monica Mirror	22,500	Free	California	--
The Pacific Northwest Inlander (Spokane)	46,500	Free	Washington	--
La Prensa Ohio (Toledo)	12,000	Free	Ohio	--
Newcity Chicago	50,000	Free	Illinois	New since 2004
The Arab American News (Detroit)	30,000	Paid	Michigan	--
Creative Loafing (Charlotte)	60,139	Free	North Carolina	--
Tucson Weekly (Tucson)	48,538	Free	Arizona	--
Jackson Free Press	16,000	Free	Mississippi	--
The Villager (New York)	20,000	Free	New York	--
Clarke County Democrat	5,000	Free	Alabama	--
The Boston Phoenix	157,000	Free	Massachusetts	--
Mesquite Local News	5,500	Free	Nevada	New since 2004
The Lincoln Journal (Hamlin)	17,000	Paid	West Virginia	--
Fort Lauderdale Westside Gazette	50,000	Free	Florida	--
The Taos News	10,000	Paid	New Mexico	--
Bay Windows (Boston)	14,595	Free	Massachusetts	--
The Redding Pilot	2,420	Paid	Connecticut	--
New York Gay City News	47,000	Free	New York	--
The Tuskegee News	4,200	Paid	Alabama	--
St. Louis American	67,000	Free	Missouri	Kerry
The Storm Lake Times (2x-weekly)	3,200	Paid	Iowa	Kerry
Ouray County Plaindealer	3,000	Paid	Colorado	Kerry
The Michigan Chronicle (Detroit)	31,872	Paid	Michigan	--
The Falls Church News-Press	30,500	Paid	Virginia	Kerry
Southwest News-Herald (Chicago)	9,300	Paid	Illinois	Kerry
Yamhill Valley News-Register (McMinnville) (2x-weekly)	10,921	Paid	Oregon	Bush
Gunnison Country Times	3,900	Paid	Colorado	No Endorsement
The Cortez Journal (3x-weekly)	7,000	Paid	Colorado	Kerry
The Aurora Sentinel	18,000	Paid	Colorado	Kerry
Amesbury News	1,800	Paid	Massachusetts	--
Downtown Express (New York)	40,000	Free	New York	--
Idaho Mountain Express (Twin Falls)	13,000	Free	Idaho	--
Las Vegas CityLife	77,710	Free	Nevada	--
Carteret County News-Times	11,231	Paid	North Carolina	--
Washington Blade	38,000	Free	District of Columbia	--
Weekly Alibi (Albuquerque)	45,453	Free	New Mexico	--
Athens News (2x-weekly)	17,974	Free	Ohio	--
Baltimore City Paper	85,475	Free	Maryland	--
Boulder Weekly	25,000	Free	Colorado	--
Charleston City Paper	40,000	Free	South Carolina	--
Reno News & Review	25,038	Free	Nevada	--
Sacramento News & Review	80,500	Free	California	--
Chico News & Review	39,425	Free	California	--
Lansing City Pulse	16,400	Free	Michigan	--
Colorado Springs Independent	36,500	Free	Colorado	--
Creative Loafing (Atlanta)	112,004	Free	Georgia	--
Eugene Weekly	38,492	Free	Oregon	--
Flagpole Magazine (Athens)	15,215	Free	Georgia	--
Las Vegas Weekly	68,462	Free	Nevada	--
Long Island Press	97,473	Free	New York	--
Los Angeles CityBeat	109,911	Free	California	--
Memphis Flyer	52,153	Free	Tennessee	Kerry
Metro Pulse (Knoxville)	35,000	Free	Tennessee	--
Metro Santa Cruz	33,000	Free	California	--
Metro Silicon Valley (San Jose)	74,538	Free	California	--
Metro Times (Detroit)	90,050	Free	Michigan	--
Metroland (Albany)	40,000	Free	New York	--
Monterey County Weekly	37,876	Free	California	--
North Bay Bohemian (Santa Rosa)	31,173	Free	California	--
Palo Alto Weekly	43,024	Free	California	--
Pasadena Weekly	39,662	Free	California	--
Portland Mercury	41,854	Free	Oregon	--
Portland Phoenix	40,000	Free	Maine	--
Providence Phoenix	68,000	Free	Rhode Island	--
Random Lengths News (Palos Verdes)	22,500	Free	California	--
San Diego CityBeat	43,357	Free	California	--
Santa Barbara Independent	40,000	Free	California	--
Santa Fe Reporter	22,726	Free	New Mexico	--
Cleveland Scene	63,846	Free	Ohio	--
Shepherd Express (Milwaukee)	64,655	Free	Wisconsin	--
Source Weekly (Bend)	14,573	Free	Oregon	--
Ventura County Reporter	30,780	Free	California	--
Worcester Magazine	34,000	Free	Massachusetts	--
The Timberjay Newspapers (Ely/Tower/Cook)	4,000	Paid	Minnesota	--
Al Dia (Philadelphia)	62,000	Free	Pennsylvania	Kerry
Philadelphia Tribune (3x-weekly)	13,206	Paid	Pennsylvania	--
Smithtown News	11,000	Paid	New York	--
New Pittsburgh Courier (Pittsburgh)	20,000	Paid	Pennsylvania	--
Warwick Beacon (2x-weekly)	8,909	Paid	Rhode Island	--
Hollis/Brookline Journal	5,800	Paid	Massachusetts	--
Bedford Journal	9,500	Paid	Massachusetts	--
Merrimack Journal	10,700	Paid	Massachusetts	--
Hunterdon Review	2,300	Paid	New York	--
The Sylva Herald and Ruralite	7,200	Paid	North Carolina	--
Tideland News (Swansboro)	2,554	Paid	North Carolina	--
Creative Loafing (Tampa Bay)	62,176	Free	Florida	--
Creative Loafing (Sarasota)	17,684	Free	Florida	--
Lynden Tribune	7,000	Paid	Washington	--
Southgate News-Herald	6,246	Paid	Michigan	--
Newtown Bee	8,000	Paid	New York	--
Portland Observer	31,000	Free	Oregon	--
Queens Tribune	146,000	Free	New York	--
Roxbury Register	2,400	Paid	New Jersey	--
Savannah Tribune	15,000	Free	Georgia	--
South Florida Times	22,000	Free	Florida	--
Weston Forum	4,300	Paid	Connecticut	--

== College and University newspapers for Obama ==
Newspaper	Institution	Largest Reported Circulation	Frequency	State	2004 endorsement
The Daily Nexus	Univ. of Calif. - Santa Barbara	11,000	Daily	California	--
Columbia Daily Spectator	Columbia University	10,000	Daily	New York	Kerry
The Daily Californian	Univ. of Calif. - Berkeley	10,000	Daily	California	--
The Daily Campus	Southern Methodist Univ.	5,000	Daily	Texas	--
The Daily Gamecock	Univ. of South Carolina	28,000	Daily	South Carolina	--
The Daily Northwestern	Northwestern Univ.	7,500	Daily	Illinois	--
The Post	Ohio Univ. - Athens	14,000	Daily	Ohio	--
The Daily Evergreen	Washington State Univ.	12,000	Daily	Washington	--
The Harvard Crimson	Harvard University	15,000	Daily	Massachusetts	--
Daily Eastern News	Eastern Illinois Univ.	8,500	Daily	Illinois	--
Indiana Daily Student	Indiana Univ.	15,000	Daily	Indiana	--
Iowa State Daily	Iowa State Univ.	13,500	Daily	Iowa	--
Daily Kent Stater	Kent State Univ.	12,000	Daily	Ohio	--
The Parthenon	Marshall Univ.	6,000	Daily	West Virginia	--
The State News	Michigan State Univ.	27,500	Daily	Michigan	--
Northern Star	Northern Illinois Univ.	16,000	Daily	Illinois	--
Tufts Daily	Tufts Univ.	4,050	Daily	Massachusetts	--
Arizona Daily Wildcat	Univ. of Arizona	17,000	Daily	Arizona	--
Daily Bruin	Univ. of Calif. - Los Angeles	10,000	Daily	California	--
Daily Illini	Univ. of Illinois - Champaign/Urbana	18,000	Daily	Illinois	--
University Daily Kansan	Univ. of Kansas	11,500	Daily	Kansas	--
Michigan Daily	Univ. of Michigan	12,000	Daily	Michigan	--
Oklahoma Daily	Univ. of Oklahoma	11,000	Daily	Oklahoma	--
Daily Pennsylvanian	Univ. of Pennsylvania	20,300	Daily	Pennsylvania	--
Daily Athenaeum	West Virginia Univ.	15,000	Daily	West Virginia	--
Daily Cardinal	Univ. of Wisconsin - Madison	10,000	Daily	Wisconsin	--
Pitt News	Univ. of Pittsburgh	14,000	Daily	Pennsylvania	--
Badger Herald	Univ. of Wisconsin - Madison	16,000	Daily	Wisconsin	--
The Daily Toreador	Texas Tech. Univ. - Lubbock	12,000	Daily	Texas	--
The Daily Campus	Univ. of Conn.	10,000	Daily	Connecticut	--
BG News	Bowling Green State Univ.	9,500	Daily	Ohio	--
Colorado Daily	Univ. of Colorado	29,000	Daily	Colorado	--
Duke Chronicle	Duke University	15,000	Weekly	North Carolina	--
The Pacer	Univ. of Tenn. - Martin	2,000	Weekly	Tennessee	--
The Miami Student	Miami Univ. - Oxford	9,000	2x-weekly	Ohio	--
New University	Univ. of Calif - Irvine	10,000	Weekly	California	--
The Rocket	Slippery Rock Univ.	3,000	Weekly	Pennsylvania	--
The Michigan Journal	Univ. of Michigan - Dearborn		Weekly	Michigan	--
The Advance-Titan	Univ. of Wisconsin - Oshkosh	11,000	Weekly	Wisconsin	--
The Maneater	Univ. of Missouri	8,000	Weekly	Missouri	--
The Optimist	Abilene Christian Univ.		Weekly	Texas	--
The Brandeis Justice	Brandeis Univ.		Weekly	Massachusetts	--
Bowdoin Orient	Bowdoin Univ.	2,300	Weekly	Maine	--
The Orion	Calif. State Univ. - Chico	7,000	Weekly	California	--
Central Michigan Life	Central Michigan Univ.	13,500	Weekly	Michigan	--
Et Cetera	Eastfield College	2,500	bi-weekly	Texas	--
Berkeley Beacon	Emerson College		Weekly	Massachusetts	--
El Vaquero)	Glendale Comm. College		Weekly	California	--
The University News	St. Louis Univ.	6,500	Weekly	Missouri	--
The Point News	St. Mary's College		bi-weekly	Maryland	--
The Reporter	Stetson Univ.	2,000	Weekly	Florida	--
Pipe Dream	SUNY - Binghamton	7,000	2x-weekly	New York	--
The Lamron	SUNY - Geneseo	3,000	Weekly	New York	--
The Phoenix	Swarthmore College	2,000	Weekly	Pennsylvania	--
Central Florida Future	Univ. of Central Florida	15,000	3x-weekly	Florida	--
Louisville Cardinal	Univ. of Louisville	8,000	Weekly	Kentucky	--
The Cardinal Points	SUNY - Plattsburgh	3,000	Weekly	New York	--
The Voice	Washtenaw Comm. College		Weekly	Michigan	--
Independent Collegian	Univ. of Toledo	10,000	2x-weekly	Ohio	--
The Arbiter	Boise State Univ.	6,000	2x-weekly	Idaho	--
The Stony Brook Statesman	SUNY - Stonybrook	12,000	2x-weekly	New York	--
The Davidsonian	Davidson College	3,000	Weekly	North Carolina	--
The Bates Student	Bates College	1,900	Weekly	Maine	--
The Circle	Marist College	2,000	Weekly	New York	--
The Middlebury Campus	Middlebury College	2,350	Weekly	Vermont	--
The Cornell Daily Sun	Cornell Univ.	6,000	Daily	New York	Kerry
Yale Daily News	Yale Univ.	7,500	Daily	Connecticut	--
The Flat Hat	College of William and Mary	5,500	Weekly	Virginia	--
The Tech	Mass. Institute of Tech.	15,000	Weekly	Massachusetts	--
The Sophian	Smith College	3,500	Weekly	Massachusetts	--
The Amherst Student	Amherst College	5,000	Weekly	Massachusetts	--
Daily Texan	Univ. of Texas - Austin	28,000	Daily	Texas	--
The Mac Weekly	Macalester College	1,600	Weekly	Minnesota	--
Minnesota Daily	Univ. of Minnesota	27,000	Daily	Minnesota	--
Fairfield Mirror	Fairfield University	4,000	Weekly	Connecticut	--
The California Aggie	Univ. of Calif - Davis	13,000	Daily	California	--
Daily Iowan	Univ. of Iowa	19,500	Daily	Iowa	--
The Independent Florida Alligator	Univ. of Florida	35,000	Daily	Florida	--
Daily Trojan	Univ. of Southern California	51,000	Daily	California	--
Hofstra Chronicle	Hofstra University	4,500	Weekly	New York	--
The Collegian	Calif. State Univ. - Fresno	5,000	3x-weekly	California	--
Crimson White	Univ. of Alabama - Tuscaloosa	15,000	Daily	Alabama	--
Daily Collegian	Penn State University	20,300	Daily	Pennsylvania	--
Daily Tar Heel	Univ. of North Carolina - Chapel Hill	20,000	Daily	North Carolina	--
Daily Trojan	Univ. of Southern Calif.	10,000	Daily	California	--
Daily Utah Chronicle	Univ. of Utah - Salt Lake City	14,000	Daily	Utah	--
The Miscellany News	Vassar College		Weekly	New York	--
Stanford Daily	Stanford University	10,000	Daily	California	--
UVU Review	Utah Valley Univ.		Weekly	Utah	--
The Tartan	Gordon College	1,300	Weekly	Georgia	--

== Magazines and other publications ==
Publication	Circulation	2004 Endorsement
The New Yorker	1,043,931	--
The New Republic	65,779	--
Vibe	876,262	--
Rolling Stone	1,453,385	--
Esquire	726,358	--
AsianWeek	58,099	--
Poder Magazine	62,214	--
Seed	132,925	--
Nature	60,426	--
The Economist	747,254 (North American Edition)	Kerry

== See also ==
- Newspaper endorsements in the United States presidential primaries
