= List of family-owned newspapers in the United States =

The following is a partial list of family-owned newspapers in the United States. It represents the small subset of the list of newspapers in the United States which are run by a family business, and may include exceptions to or examples of concerns about concentration of media ownership.

== A - L ==
- The Adair County Free Press, Greenfield, Iowa – established 1889 by the Sidey family, still in operation
- The Argus-Press, Owosso, Michigan – established 1916
- The Bangor Daily News, Bangor, Maine – family-owned since 1889
- The Barre-Montpelier Times Argus – Barre Times and Montpelier Argus, both est. 1897, merged in 1959, owned by Mitchell family since 1964
- The Bourbon County Citizen – family-owned and operated by the Brannon family in Paris, Kentucky
- The Buffalo Bulletin - family-owned and operated by the Hicks in Johnson County, Wyoming
- The Caledonian-Record – family-owned and operated by the Smith family in St. Johnsbury, Vermont
- Casa Grande Valley Newspapers Inc., Casa Grande, Arizona – family-owned and operated by the Kramer family since 1963
- The Chronicle, Centralia, WA — established in 1889, owned by the Taylor family, Chad & Coralee Taylor (CT Publishing LLC)
- The Citizen-Advertiser – TMC publication, family-owned and operated by the Brannnon family in Paris, Kentucky
- The Clayton Record, Clayton, Alabama – family-owned since 1915
- The Columbian, Vancouver, Washington – owned by the Campbell family since 1921
- The Commercial Dispatch, Columbus, Mississippi – family-owned since 1922
- Cortland Standard, Cortland, New York—family-owned since 1876
- The Daily Gazette, Scnenectady, NY-Owned by the Hume family
- The Daily Standard, Celina, Ohio - family-owned since 1848
- Deming Headlight, Deming, New Mexico - family-owned since 2022.
- The Durango Herald, Durango, Colorado – owned by the Ballantine family
- East Oregonian – Oregon and Washington papers, family-owned
- The Elkhart Truth, Elkhart, Indiana – family-owned since 1889
- The Emporia Gazette, Emporia, Kansas — family-owned since 1895
- Grants Pass Daily Courier, Grants Pass, Oregon — owned by the Voorhies family since 1897
- Greenville Journal, Greenville, South Carolina—family-owned since 1999
- The Hardwick Gazette, Hardwick, Vermont – established 1889
- The Italian Tribune, aka La Tribuna del Popolo, Macomb, Michigan – founded 1909, family-owned since 1909 by the Giuliano-Baker family
- The Journal, Cortez, Colorado – owned by the Ballantine family
- The Keene Sentinel, Keene, New Hampshire – family-owned since 1799
- The Lincoln County News, Newcastle, Maine – owned by the Erskine and Roberts Family since 1920
- The Lewiston Tribune, Lewiston, Idaho - owned by the Alford family
- Kstati Russian-American Newspaper, aka Apropos Kstati, San Francisco, California – founded in 1994, family-owned and operated by the Sundeyev family

== M - Z ==
- The Madison Courier, Madison, Indiana – founded 1837, owned since 1849 by the Garber family
- The Marysville Journal-Tribune, Marysville, Ohio – continuously operating as family-owned since 1849
- The Mooreland Leader, Mooreland, Oklahoma – Schnoebelen family-owned since 1903
- News-Register, McMinnville, Oregon – family-owned since 1928
- The Newtown Bee, Newtown, Connecticut – family-owned since 1881
- Press Enterprise, Bloomsburg, Pennsylvania – family-owned since 1902
- Polk County News, Benton, Ducktown, Copperhill TN- local family-owned since 1883
- The Rome Sentinel Company, Rome, New York – started in the 1820s, family-owned since 1864
- The Roswell Daily Record, Roswell, New Mexico – started in 1891, family-owned
- The Rutland Herald, Rutland, Vermont – started in 1794, family-owned entire history, Mitchell family since 1947
- The Villages Daily Sun, started in 1997, family owned.
- Silver City Daily Press and Independent, Silver City, New Mexico - family-owned since 1896
- Shaw Media (United States), Dixon, Illinois – established in 1851
- Smith Publishing & Media Group, Walnut, California – family-owned since 2006
- Sonoma West Publishers (Sonoma West Times & News, The Healdsburg Tribune, The Cloverdale Reveille, and the Windsor Times)
- The Southern Star, Ozark, Alabama – family-owned since 1867
- The Spokesman-Review, Spokane, Washington – family-owned and published by the Cowles family since 1894
- Steamboat Pilot & Today, Routt County, Colorado – owned by WorldWest LLC, a family-owned company based in Lawrence, Kansas
- Sun Journal, Lewiston, Maine – family-owned and published by the Costello family since 1898
- Town Topics, Princeton, New Jersey – family-owned since 1946
- Town Tribune, New Fairfield, Connecticut – family-owned
- Valley India Times – Indo-American newspaper, Dholakia family-owned since 2000
- Weeklys— Formerly Metro Newspapers, established in 1985 in San Jose, California.
- Wick Communications, Sierra Vista, Arizona – Wick family-owned chain of newspapers in 12 states since 1926
