= Deming Headlight =

Newspaper in New Mexico, United States

- Type: Twice-weekly newspaper
- Format: Tabloid
- Owner: Nickolas C. Seibel
- Founder: James E. Curren
- Founded: 1881
- Language: English
- Headquarters: Deming, New Mexico
- Sister newspapers: Silver City Daily Press and Independent
- ISSN: 0738-8349
- Website: demingheadlight.com

The Deming Headlight is a newspaper in Deming, New Mexico, United States.

== History ==
On June 25, 1881, James Edward Curren published the first edition of the Deming Headlight in Deming, New Mexico. Curren founded 17 newspapers throughout his life. The name of his Deming paper was a reference to the trains on the Southern Pacific Railroad. In 1884, Curren left the Headlight after trading it for the Kingston Clipper, which he renamed to the Sierra County Advocate.

Alva C. Lowry published the paper briefly. He was followed as editor by A. R. Loomis in 1885, Captain Edward Pennington in 1886, former governor Edmund G. Ross in 1889, William B. Walton in 1892, and R. G. Clark in January 1897, who left later that year. In March 1898, J. A. Long acquired the paper, followed in July 1898 by George L. Shakespeare.

In 1902, Shakespeare sued P. J. Bennet, publisher of the Deming Herald, for libel, and sought $5,000 in damages. In 1911, Shakespeare sold the paper to Roy Bedichek and Edwin R. Vallandigham. Later that year J. H. Shepard was hired as editor, and after a year was replaced by L. O. Danse. In 1915, Headlight founder Curren died. Vallandigham assumed full control of the paper from Bedichek and published it until his death in 1922. His widow then leased the paper to John A. Griffin, who died in 1924. Griffin's widow then published the paper for a year. In 1925, Mrs. Vallandigham sold the paper to Col. Clyde Earl Ely.

In 1926, P.M. McInnis and Captain Charles G. Sage purchased the Headlight from Ely. In 1927, P.M. McInnis retired due to poor health and sold out to Sage. A month later Sage was involved in a car crash. In 1933, Sage purchased the Lordsburg Liberal. In 1937, Sage purchased the Hatch Reporter. In 1948, Sage purchased the Deming Graphic from Mrs. M. F. Brumback.

In 1955, Sage, now a Major General, sold the Headlight and Graphic to David L. "Pappy" Watson. In 1961, Richard J. Hodson and James D. Glatt bought the papers, and Watson continued to work as publisher until he died later that year. Glatt later bought Hodson out. In 1966, he sold the papers to Graham M. Dean, owner of the Artesia Daily Press. In 1970, James K. Green purchased the three New Mexican papers from Dean. In 1979, the Graphic was absorbed into the Headlight.

In 1988, the Green family sold the Headlight, Ruidoso News and El Defensor-Chieftain to Jack Kent Cooke, owner of the Washington Redskins and the Los Angeles Daily News. In 1989, Cooke acquired the Valencia County News-Bulletin. In 1999, MediaNews Group acquired the Headlight. The Headlight later became part of the Texas-New Mexico Newspapers Partnership, a joint venture formed in 2003 between MediaNews Group and Gannett, with MediaNews Group the managing partner. In 2015, Gannett acquired full ownership of the Texas-New Mexico Newspapers Partnership. In 2017, the Headlight decreased its print edition from five days a week to two. In 2022, Gannett sold the Headlight to Nickolas C. Seibel, publisher of the Silver City Daily Press and Independent.
