= Ruidoso News =

Biweekly newspaper published in Ruidoso, New Mexico

- Type: Biweekly newspaper
- Owner(s): El Rito Media, LLC
- Founder: Lloyd P. Bloodworth
- Publisher: Richard L. Connor
- Founded: 1946
- Language: English
- Headquarters: Ruidoso, New Mexico
- Website: ruidosonews.com

Ruidoso News is a biweekly newspaper in Ruidoso, New Mexico, United States. It has been published since 1946.

== History ==
On May 16, 1946, Lloyd P. Bloodworth first published the Ruidoso News in Ruidoso, New Mexico. In 1949, he sold the paper Louis R. Spain, and bought it back a year later. In 1951, Bloodworth sold the News again, this time to Ben Vaughn and Victor "Vic" Lamb. Vaughn soon exited the business. In 1953, Lamb acquired a press and opened a print shop in Ruidoso.

In 1968, Barney Barnett, of San Luis Obispo, California, bought the News, only for ownership to revert back to Lamb less than a year later. Barnett said he sold the paper because his political and social views greatly differed from those of Ruidoso residents. A month later, Lamb bought a variety store in Sedona, Arizona. In 1970, husband-and-wife Alton and Glorianna Lane bought the paper. In 1975, brothers Ken Green and Walt Green, publishers of the Artesia Daily Press and Deming Headlight, bought the News from the Lanes.

In 1988, the Green family sold the News, Headlight and El Defensor-Chieftain to Jack Kent Cooke, owner of the Washington Redskins and the Los Angeles Daily News. In 1989, Cooke acquired the Valencia County News-Bulletin. Cooke sold his four New Mexican papers to WorldWest in 1994. The News was acquired by MediaNews Group in 2001. Gannett bought the News in 2015, and sold it, along with the Carlsbad Current-Argus and Alamogordo Daily News, to El Rito Media, LLC in 2024.
