= Post Concussion =

- Directed by: Daniel Yoon
- Written by: Daniel Yoon
- Produced by: Daniel Yoon
- Starring: Daniel Yoon; Jennifer Welch
- Cinematography: Daniel Yoon
- Edited by: Daniel Yoon
- Release date: 7 October 1999 (Austin Film Festival)
- Running time: 82 minutes
- Country: United States
- Language: English

Post Concussion is a 1999 American comedy-drama film directed by Daniel Yoon, starring Yoon and Jennifer Welch.

== Cast ==
- Daniel Yoon as Matthew Kang
- Jennifer Welch as Monica
- Michael Hohmeyer
- Destry Miller
- Niloufar Talebi
- C.B. Yoon as Matthew's mother
- Don Chen
- Felecia Faulkner as Luna

== Reception ==
Marc Horton of the Edmonton Journal wrote, "Hollywood has made countless movies where sickness serves as the catalyst for fundamental change in a person's soul. It's not often, however, where they make them with Yoon's level of integrity and disarming charm." Lauren Mechling of the National Post wrote that Yoon "succeeds in creating a movie that is both personal and clever." Merle Bertrand of Film Threat wrote that the film is "a charming and disarming winner, primarily due to Yoon’s relaxed and natural portrayal of Matthew." Don Houston of DVD Talk rated the film 3 stars out of 5, and called the it "witty, inventive, and twisted", and a "stunning indictment on corporate policy and the material world far too many of us have succumbed to in recent decades."

Anothony DellaFlora of the Albuquerque Journal wrote that while Yoon "pushes the envelope a bit too much", the film is "hilarious and touching, yet never sentimental." Liam Lacey of The Globe and Mail rated the film 2.5 stars out of 4 and wrote, "Even at 82 minutes, Yoon's film sometimes feels padded, but when he hits the mark, he makes the weaknesses forgivable." Geoff Pevere of the Toronto Star wrote that the film "has a shaggy-pup, eager-to-please quality that is both its most appealing and annoying quality." Ken Eisner of Variety wrote a mixed review of the film.
