= We Demand the Right to Vote =

2020 non-fiction book by Meneese Wall

We Demand the Right to Vote: The Journey to the 19th Amendment
- Author: Meneese Wall
- Genre: Non-fiction
- Published: 2020
- Publisher: Paxton Press
- ISBN: 978-1734901009

We Demand the Right to Vote: The Journey to the 19th Amendment is a 2020 illustrated non-fiction book by Meneese Wall. The book covers an overview of the women's suffrage movement in the United States, from 1848 to 1920.

== About ==
Meneese Wall, a graphic artist, was inspired to write the book when her daughter was upset by the lack of women's history in her school's history classes, which focused mainly on "dead White guys." Wall researched the topic and worked with historians to write the book. The book is an overview of the women's suffrage movement in the United States.

We Demand was the winner in the history category and "Best of Show" in 2020 Southwest Book Design and Production Awards Competition sponsored by the New Mexico Book Association.

== Reviews ==
Carol Lasser, a professor emerita from Oberlin College said that the combination of illustrations and text in We Demand "really enriches the story." Jennifer Levin, writing in The Santa Fe New Mexican, says "What We Demand the Right to Vote conveys most clearly is the tireless dedication required to create social change and how long that change can take." AAUW in Bennington, Vermont praised the images created for the book which they felt helped people see the leaders of the movement in a new way.
