= Las Vegas Optic =

Newspaper published in Las Vegas, New Mexico

The Las Vegas Optic
- Type: Twice-weekly newspaper
- Format: Broadsheet
- Owner: O’Rourke Media Group
- Founder(s): W.J. "Jap" Turpen; Russell A. Kistler
- Editor: Phil Scherer
- Founded: 1879
- Language: English
- OCLC number: 7880971
- Website: lasvegasoptic.com

The Las Vegas Optic is a newspaper located in Las Vegas, New Mexico. Published on Wednesday and Friday of each week, it serves San Miguel and Mora counties.

== History ==
In May 1879, W.J. "Jap" Turpen and Russell A. Kistler published the first edition of The Otero Optic in Otero County, New Mexico. Two months later the paper relocated to Las Vegas, New Mexico. That August, it was relaunched as the Las Vegas Optic. Turpen left a few months later. The Optic was then expanded from a weekly into a daily. Winchester Dove Kistler assisted his brother at the paper. In 1890, he died.

In September 1897, Kistler formed the Las Vegas Publishing Company, which operated the paper and was majority owned by Kistler. In February 1898, Kistler retired from the business, only to return two years later. The paper soon encountered some financial difficulties and in 1902 it was acquired by the Allen brothers. C.W. Allen soon left for a job at the El Paso Herald while L. H. Allen remained at the Optic. In March 1903, James Graham McNary bought the paper. L.H. Allen retained stock and stayed on as business manager. A month later the company bought and absorbed a rival paper called the Daily Record.

In 1907, McNary leased the Optic to M.M. Padgett. McNary soon disposed of his interest after becoming a banker. In 1914, Optic founder Kistler died. His obituary called him "a clever writer, with a breezy style." In 1921, Padgett resigned and sold off his stock. Cecil W. Johnson then succeeded him. In 1922, Johnson resigned and was replaced by Herbert "Hub" W. Kane.

In 1930, a former employee filed a $60,000 lawsuit against Kane for injuries resulting from when a car she was in, driven by Kane, crashed and rolled over on the highway. In July 1947, Kane died from a heart attack. Four months later, his estate sold the paper to Orville E. Priestley and James H. Skewes, owners of the Las Cruces Sun-News. In 1949, Lincoln O'Brien purchased the Optic. He also bought the Tucumcari News from Richard Hindley. Later that year O'Brien acquired the Farmington Times-Hustler and turned it into the Farmington Daily Times.

In 1956, Thomas R. Wright acquired the Optic. Brothers Lawrence "Larry" R. Finch and J. Clayton Finch bought a share. In 1959, Wright resigned and the Finches became the sole owners. In 1966, Robert M. McKinney acquired the paper, and a year later sold it to brothers Stuart R. Beck and Robert H. Beck, owners of the Roswell Daily Record. Stuart's wife Lois Weekes Beck was soon hired as a reporter.

In 1971, Stuart Beck was elected president of the New Mexico Press Association. That same year, the Associated Press issued a citation praising the Optic for its contributions to the wire service, and nominated Lois Beck for a Pulitzer Prize for her reporting racial strife at New Mexico Highlands University. In 1972, Lois Beck was appointed editor. In 1975, she stepped down but continued to write for the Optic. In 1990, Lois Beck died. A year later she was posthumously inducted into the NMPA Hall of Fame. Her husband later remarried.

In 1998, Stuart Beck died from a heart attack. In 2002, his widow Delia Beck and brother Robert Beck sold the paper to Landmark Community Newspapers. The company was acquired by Paxton Media Group in 2021, and a month later the Optic was sold to O’Rourke Media Group.
