= UVU Review =

Student newspaper at Utah Valley University

- Type: Student newspaper
- Format: Broadsheet
- Owner: Independent (Utah Valley University)
- Publisher: Ogden Newspapers of Utah
- Editor: Crystal Pugina - Executive News Director Matthew Drachman - Editor-in-chief
- Founded: July 1, 2008
- Political alignment: Moderate editorial opinion
- Headquarters: 800 West University Parkway; Orem, Utah, UT 84058; United States
- Website: uvureview.com

UVU Review is the independent, student media organization for Utah Valley University, it is completely student-run and includes a print newspaper, online edition/website, podcasting division, video broadcasting division, social media division, graphic design division, and a marketing division. The paper's name became official with its June 30, 2008 issue – the day before UVU officially became a university.

The print newspaper publishes bi-weekly on Mondays during the fall and spring semesters. The print edition is typically 8 pages using a broadsheet format, printed by Ogden Newspapers of Utah. The Review's website is updated with new content (ranging from written articles, podcasts, broadcasts, etc.) multiple times every week.

As of the 2022–2023 school year, the Review includes a news section, arts & culture section, health & wellness section, and a sports section; with new articles published to the website daily through the work-week. Additionally, they publish numerous short video broadcast packages and four different weekly podcasts (the "Cultured Wolverine," "Wellness for Wolverines," "Wolverine Sports Central," and the "Wolverine Buzz"). Most recently they launched a new broadcast/podcast collaboration project, a bi-weekly live show called the "Wolverine Pack."

The staff is student-operated, receiving on-the-job training as well as attending national journalism conferences, both professional and collegiate The newspaper made reports across the country as the entire circulation run was reported as stolen from stands on campus.

== Notes ==
- Expert Product Reviews

== See also ==
- List of newspapers in Utah (College)
- List of student newspapers in the United States of America
- Utah Valley University
- Newspaper endorsements in the United States presidential election, 2008, for Barack Obama
