= Carl Magee =

American lawyer and publisher (1873–1946)

Carl Magee at desk in Oklahoma City

Carlton Cole "Carl" Magee (January 5, 1873 – January 31, 1946) was an American educator, lawyer and newspaper editor instrumental in exposing the Teapot Dome scandal. He is also credited for patenting the first practical parking meter, and spearheading efforts to develop the first working models.

== Biography ==
Magee was born in Fayette County, Iowa. His father, John Calvin Magee, was a prominent Methodist Episcopal minister. Carl Magee graduated from the Iowa State Normal School, later the University of Northern Iowa, in Cedar Falls, Iowa, in 1894 after serving as editor of the student newspaper. He married a college classmate, Grace Griffin, in 1895. Magee worked several years as an educator in Iowa and was involved in launching a correspondence school for farmers called the Correspondence Agricultural College.

=== Tulsa activism ===
In 1904, the Magees moved to Tulsa, Indian Territory, where he began practicing law and was active as a civic booster. He chaired the board of directors of the YMCA for about eight years from its inception in the city and worked to establish troops of Boy Scouts then served as president of the Boy Scout council. He served on the school board and battled political favoritism in the school district as well as partisanship in municipal government. He helped instigate a grand jury investigation of local corruption that resulted in the indictment of Tulsa Mayor Frank M. Wooden, as well as the police chief, police commissioner, and county sheriff. Magee also was a leader in the campaign to bring water to Tulsa from the Spavinaw Creek basin, a project that secured the city’s municipal water supply. When Oklahoma achieved statehood, he unsuccessfully sought the Republican nomination for Congress from the state’s new Third Congressional District.

=== Albuquerque newspaper battles ===
Grace Magee developed tuberculosis, and starting in 1916 the family relocated to Albuquerque, New Mexico, for her health. There Magee decided to pursue a long-held dream of publishing a “truth-telling newspaper,” and in 1920 he bought the Albuquerque Journal from a consortium that had used it to re-elect Albert Bacon Fall to the U.S. Senate. Magee began using the newspaper to expose corruption, especially in the state Land Office, with the help of reporter Clinton P. Anderson, who later would become a prominent New Mexico politician and businessman. The investigations enraged Fall, who brought financial pressure that forced Magee to sell the newspaper in May 1922.

Less than a month later, Magee launched a new newspaper, a weekly called Magee’s Independent. The following year he turned it into a daily called the New Mexico State Tribune. (In 1933 it would become The Albuquerque Tribune, which would remain in business until 2008). Magee continued his muckraking and was charged with criminal libel in Las Vegas, New Mexico, where, he said, the courts were controlled by a “copper-riveted” Republican political machine headed by U.S. Marshal Secudino Romero. Magee was found guilty of libel and contempt in the courtroom of Judge David Leahy, who sentenced him to prison. But Governor James F. Hinkle, a Democrat, pardoned Magee on all charges on July 16, 1923.

Two years later, on August 21, 1925, Leahy encountered Magee in the lobby of the Meadows hotel (later the El Fidel Hotel) in Las Vegas and attacked him. Knocked to the floor, Magee got a pistol from his pocket and shot Leahy in the arm. But he also accidentally shot John B. Lassetter, a Highway Department project engineer, who had rushed over to help. Lassetter died, and Magee was tried the following year for manslaughter but acquitted.

=== Teapot Dome affair ===
Albert Fall, meanwhile, had been appointed secretary of the interior by President Warren Harding. In that role, Fall issued secret, no-bid leases to two oilmen -- Edward L. Doheny and Harry Ford Sinclair – allowing them to drill in the naval petroleum reserves at Elk Hills, California, and Teapot Dome, Wyoming. The U.S. Senate launched an inquiry into the leases on April 29, 1922, and Magee, who still owned the Journal at the time, began raising questions about Fall’s sudden affluence. After launching the Tribune, Magee collaborated with a reporter from the Denver Post, D.F. Stackelbeck, who gathered evidence of Fall’s newfound wealth. But the Post’s publisher, Frederick Bonfils, refused to publish the information.

In September 1923, Magee agreed to sell controlling interest in the Tribune to the Scripps-Howard newspaper group, which retained him as editor. He told the concern’s executives of his suspicions about Fall and about the information he and Stackelbeck had uncovered. That information was passed on to U.S. Senator Thomas J. Walsh of Montana, who was leading the Senate Public Lands Committee probe of the oil leases. Walsh called Magee to testify before the committee, and his testimony on November 30, 1923, drew intense public attention to what became known as the Teapot Dome scandal. Subsequent investigation revealed that Doheny and Sinclair had paid Fall hundreds of thousands of dollars during contract negotiations. Fall was convicted of bribery and became the first cabinet secretary sent to prison.

In 1924, Magee sought the Democratic nomination for U.S. Senate from New Mexico. He led on the first two ballots of the convention before yielding to the candidacy of Samuel G. Bratton, who subsequently was elected to the post.

=== Scripps-Howard motto ===
Starting in 1921, Magee began using a motto in his newspapers: “Give light and the people will find their own way.” He attributed it to Dante Alighieri though it bears little resemblance to an actual quote in The Divine Comedy. When Scripps-Howard bought the Tribune, it adopted the motto as its own corporate motto, and on May 1, 1927, it introduced an image of a lighthouse as a corporate logo based on the motto and on a recurring column that Magee wrote called “Turning on the Light.” The motto and lighthouse logo continued to be used by the company as it evolved into a media conglomerate called the E.W. Scripps Co.

=== Launch of parking meter ===
In October 1927, Scripps-Howard transferred Magee to Oklahoma City to serve as editor of the company’s Oklahoma News. Magee joined the Oklahoma City Chamber of Commerce traffic committee in 1933, charged with lessening the escalating traffic congestion in the city's downtown. Local merchants complained that their sales were hurt by low traffic turnover, since parking spaces adjacent to downtown businesses were occupied by the same cars all day. Magee conceived the idea of a coin-operated timer that could be used to increase traffic turnover in busy commercial thoroughfares. He built a crude model and applied for a patent on December 21, 1932. He then sponsored a contest at Oklahoma Agricultural and Mechanical College (later Oklahoma State University) to develop a working device. After the contest, Oklahoma A&M Professors H. G. Thuesen and Gerald Hale helped him develop his model into an operating meter.

The first parking meters were installed in downtown Oklahoma City on July 16, 1935, and charged five cents per hour. Businesses benefited greatly from the decreased parking congestion, but some citizens complained and initiated legal action in response to installation of the meters. That failed to halt implementation of the meters, and other cities soon installed parking meters of their own. Magee’s first company was the Dual Parking Meter Co., which Hale joined. The meters were manufactured in Tulsa by the MacNick Company. In May 1940, control of Dual was sold to a competitor, Union Metal Manufacturing of Canton, Ohio. But after World War II, Magee and Hale launched the Magee-Hale Park-O-Meter Company with a modernized meter. Rockwell International later purchased the company and moved its production to Russellville, Arkansas in 1964. Rockwell employees and Arkansas investors formed POM Incorporated in 1976 and purchased the meter business. In 1981, the company was purchased by Seth “Skeeter” Ward II of Little Rock, Arkansas, and continued to be owned and operated by the Ward family after his death in 2013.

=== Final days and fate of family ===
In 1936, Grace Griffin Magee died. The following year, Magee began dating Perle Mesta, a socialite who would achieve fame as "the hostess with the mostes'." Their relationship ended when she refused Magee's marriage proposal. During this time, Magee moved to Harlingen, Texas, where he worked as editor-in-chief of a group of newspapers: the Brownsville Herald, the Valley Morning Star in Harlingen, and the McAllen Monitor. He returned to Oklahoma City in 1939 and threw himself into volunteerism. During World War II, he headed the Oklahoma War Chest, raising money for the USO, Red Cross, and similar programs to support American GIs.

Magee died in Oklahoma City on January 31, 1946.

Carl and Grace Magee had three children: Carlton Cole Magee Jr., Theodore Percival Magee, and Gertrude “Trudy” Magee. The sons died in separate airplane crashes, Carl Jr. while learning to fly in Tulsa in 1925 and “Ted” while traveling on business for the Park-O-Meter company in 1949 when Eastern Air Lines Flight 537 collided with a military plane approaching National Airport in Washington, D.C., in what was then the nation’s worst air disaster. Trudy Magee married John D. “Tony” Grenko, a University of New Mexico star athlete who became a chemist. In 1946, the Grenkos moved into Carlito Springs, a tourist camp in Tijeras Canyon east of Albuquerque that the Magees had bought in 1930 and named in honor of Carl Jr. The Grenkos lived at Carlito Springs for the next 50 years, beautifying and improving the mountain retreat. The 177-acre tract was purchased by the Bernalillo County open-space program in 2000.

== Sources ==
- https://web.archive.org/web/20080516050845/http://www.ionet.net/~luttrell/history.html
- http://www.rootsweb.ancestry.com/~okoklaho/obit/magee_carl_c.htm
- http://www.inc.com/magazine/20021001/24702.html
