= Hobbs News-Sun =

American daily newspaper

- Type: Daily newspaper
- Format: Broadsheet
- Owner: Sunrise Publishing
- Founder: B.W. Barnes
- Publisher: Daniel Russell
- Editor: Andy Brosig
- Founded: 1929
- Language: English
- Headquarters: Hobbs, Lea County, New Mexico
- Circulation: 10,096
- OCLC number: 10655340
- Website: hobbsnews.com

The Hobbs News-Sun is a daily newspaper published Tuesday through Sunday in Hobbs, New Mexico, featuring news, sports and other features of interest to readers in Lea County.

== History ==
In November 1929, B.W. Barnes founded the Hobbs News, the first newspaper published in Hobbs, New Mexico. Stanly Sigler soon acquired the publication and was associated with C.N. Wimberly.

In 1930, during a local oil boom, J.R. Ostrom invested in the Hobbs Weekly News to expand it into a daily paper. At that time the paper had been operated by S.H. Wimberly and Franklin Townley. A year later J.R. Ostrom chartered the Hobbs Publishing Company with Lawrence E. Ostrom. The paper soon reverted back to a weekly during the Great Depression.

In April 1936, the Hobbs News was purchased from the Ostroms by Sun Publishing Co. Editor S. Boyd Hilton, formerly manager of the Las Cruses Daily News, was a stockholder, along with Col. Clyde D. Woolworth and state Senator George T. Harris. On May 1, 1936, the weekly was expanded into a morning daily called the Hobbs Daily News.

In July 1936, the company launched an afternoon paper called the Hobbs Sunset News. In January 1937, Hilton bought out Woolworth and Harris. On March 27, 1937, Hilton suspended the Sunset, which was renamed to the Sun, after merging it with the News. A few months later the newly formed Hobbs News-Sun switched from morning to afternoon publication. In December 1937, Thomas G. Summers was named manager and replaced E.J. Kurre.

Hilton soon exited the business. In February 1938, part owner Arthur W. Cooley, of Chicago, sued Hilton for violating a Non-compete clause and force him to sever his business connections to the Hobbs Morning-Post. Cooley later amended his suit to seek $18,344 in damages. That September, Hilton reached a settlement and agreed to not work in the Hobbs publishing industry for a decade. Robert L. Summers eventually joined his brother as co-publisher. In 1948, the two were sued for libel by Mrs. J.A. Clinton, who sought $100,000 in damages.

In 1962, R. L. Summers was elected president the New Mexico Press Association. In 1977, Secretary of the Army Clifford Alexander Jr. appointed R.L. Summers as his "civilian aide" for New Mexico. In 1980, T. G. Summers died. In 1983, state Rep. Bob Moran introduced a bill to repeal the existing gross receipts tax exemption on newspaper sales after the News-Sun published a photo of Moran receiving a local award on page 20 instead of page 1. Lt. Gov. Mike Runnels cast the tie breaking vote in favor, with Gov. Toney Anaya vetoing the bill, calling it punitive legislation.

In March 1987, MediaNews Group, owner of the Del Rio News-Herald, purchased the News-Sun from R.L. Summers and Thomas B. Shearman. In August 1987, Shearman reacquired the paper, becoming its sole owner. Previously Shearman, owner of the Roswell Daily Record, had been a minority stock-owner in Sun Publishing for decades. In October 1987, R.L. was inducted into the NMPA Hall of Fame, and died a year later. Shearman died four months after him, and his family continued to operate the News-Sun. In 1990, former publisher George Moore sued the paper for libel. Moore was fired after 18 months in the position and his lawsuit dragged on for years. In 2010, the Lea County Tribune was merged into the News-Sun. In 2020, the paper ended its Saturday edition.

== Hobbs Daily Flare ==
In 1948, Agnes Kastner Head founded a rival paper called the Hobbs Daily Flare. Head's husband was a candidate for mayor, and she launched her paper because the News-Sun declined to publish ads for her husband's campaign. Head was sued for libel after her first issue. She represented herself in court and got the suit dismissed. Head then announced her campaign for Lea County sheriff. Head was a proud Conservative and enraged local bureaucrats by publishing a list of all the county welfare recipients. Her weekly column was titled "Via The Grapevine".

Over the years Head sold the paper four times, but bought it back each time. In 1990, Head was inducted into the New Mexico Press Association Hall of Fame. At that time she was believed to be the oldest working publisher in the nation. In 1992, she died at age 88. In 1993, Head's estate sold the Flare to the owners of the Golden West Free Press of Kermit, Texas. At that time the paper had a circulation of 3,000. In 1996, Sun Publishing, owner of the News-Sun, acquired the Flare. In 1998, the Flare ceased.

== Dave Oliphant ==
American poet Dave Oliphant has written in his memoir, Harbingers of Books to Come: A Texan's Literary Life, that his letter to the editors of the Hobbs News-Sun in 1969 led the list of top ten news stories of the newspaper for the year. Oliphant was employed at the New Mexico Junior College in Hobbs during the late 60's and had legal issues with the college and the town of Hobbs, and one of the News-Sun editors testified against him in a trial.
