= Carlsbad Current-Argus =

Newspaper in Carlsbad, New Mexico

- Website home page of the Carlsbad Current-Argus on September 2, 2021
- Type: Weekly newspaper
- Format: Broadsheet
- Owner(s): El Rito Media, LLC
- Editor: Jessica Onsurez
- Founded: 1889
- Language: English
- Headquarters: 620 S. Main St. Carlsbad, NM 88220; United States
- ISSN: 1522-5763
- Website: currentargus.com

The Carlsbad Current-Argus is a weekly newspaper in Carlsbad, New Mexico, United States. It has been published since 1889. The newspaper is printed in a broadsheet format.

== History ==
On October 12, 1889, the Eddy Argus was first published in Eddy, New Mexico. It was founded by A.J. Howe. He soon left the paper and died less than two years later. In September 1892, J.M Hawkins assumed control of the Argus. In November 1892, a rival paper called the Eddy Daily Current was founded, with William Henry Mullane as editor.

In 1895, Hawkins retired from the Argus and was succeeded by L.O. Fullen. In March 1902, A.D. Greene and William T. "Bill" Reed bought the Argus. Fullen remained on as editor. In September 1902, Reed bought out Greene. In 1917, Mullane sold the Current to S.L. Perry.

In 1924, C.C. Durden bought the Argus and Reed retired. In 1925, A.W. Anderson bought the Current from Perry. In 1926, the Argus and the Current merged to form the Carlsbad Current-Argus. In 1929, Durden and Anderson sold the paper to D.D. Roderick, owner of the El Paso Times, J. Lindsey Nunn and Paul Walter Jr. The Current-Argus was managed by Nunn-Warren Publishing Co., which also published the Clovis News-Journal and the Roswell Morning Dispatch.

In 1931, a new company led by George H. Hill and Nunn's son Gilmore N. Nunn was formed to operate the three New Mexican papers, along with the Raton Range in Texas. In June 1933, Current founder Mullane died. In June 1933, editor Floyd B. Rigdon and Edwin S. Kerrigan bought the Current-Argus. In 1935, the two took over a commercial print shop, and a month later Rigdon bought out Kerrigan. In 1940, Reed, who spent 35 years at the paper, died at age 72. In 1941, Kerrigan died at age 40 from a fall.

In 1966, Scripps League Newspapers purchased the paper from Rigdon. Philip F. Buckner was an investor in Scripps. In 1971, Buckner formed a company called the Buckner News Alliance, and fully acquired the Current-Argus. He soon appointed Ned Cantwell as publisher and began acquiring other publications. Cantwell and David B. Martens of Bellingham, Washington, bought the paper in 1991.

Cantwell and Martens sold the paper to World Newspapers, Inc., owners of the Omaha World-Herald in 1993. MediaNews Group sold its southwest Iowa newspaper chain to World Newspapers in 2000, and in the same transaction acquired the Current-Argus. In 2003, MediaNews and Gannett formed the Texas-New Mexico Partnership, a joint venture that would manage several papers including the Current-Argus. MediaNews acquired a majority stake two years later. In 2015, Gannett acquired full ownership of venture. In 2024, Gannett sold the Current-Argus, Alamogordo Daily News and Ruidoso News to El Rito Media, LLC. In 2026, the paper converted to a weekly.
