= Tri-City Record =

Newspaper in Farmington, New Mexico, United States

- Type: Daily newspaper
- Owner: Ballantine Communications Inc.
- Editor: Trent Stephens
- Founded: 1890 (as Junction City Times)
- Language: English
- Headquarters: 108 Main Street
- City: Farmington, New Mexico
- Country: United States
- Sister newspapers: The Durango Herald
- OCLC number: 30024519
- Website: tricityrecordnm.com

The Tri-City Record is a newspaper in Farmington, New Mexico, United States. It covers northwest New Mexico and Navajo Nation.

== History ==
In 1890, the Junction City Times was first published in Junction City, New Mexico. In 1893, the paper moved to Farmington. In 1900, it became the Farmington Times. In 1903, Robert C. Prewitt and William Butler merged the Farmington Times and the Farmington Hustler to form the Farmington Times-Hustler. Prewitt left the paper a year later. In 1919, Butler retired from the paper and he was succeeded by his son G.L. Butler and Orval Ricketts. In 1945, William Butler died.

In 1949, Lincoln O'Brien, owner of the Las Vegas Optic and the Tucumcari News, purchased the Times-Hustler from G.L. Butler. A few months later O'Brien expanded the paper from a weekly into a daily and renamed it to the Farmington Daily Times. In 1956, he sold off the Optic. In 1957, he sold off the Artesia Daily Press.

In 1971, Jack Sitton became co-publisher with O'Brien. In 1973, O'Brien was inducted into the New Mexico Press Association Hall of Fame. In 1992, O'Brien died. In 1993, Sitton died. In 1998, the O'Brien family sold the Daily Times to MediaNews Group. The Daily Times later became part of the Texas-New Mexico Newspapers Partnership, a joint venture formed in 2003 between MediaNews and Gannett, with MediaNews the managing partner.

In 2015, Gannett acquired full ownership of the partnership. In 2023, a rival newspaper called the Tri-City Record was founded by Ballantine Communications Inc. The Daily Times was acquired by Ballantine a year later and merged into the Record.

== Notable staff ==
Val Cooper, one of the first women to report on hard news for the Associated Press, worked for the Farmington Daily Times for 26 years starting in 1953. She was the managing editor for 14 years. Cooper was the first woman to be the managing editor of a daily newspaper in New Mexico.

== Awards ==
In 2011, the Farmington Daily Times won the Associated Press Managing Editors Association International Perspective Award for its coverage of broadband access on Navajo Nation.

It won the New Mexico Press Association E.H. Shaffer Award for general excellence two years in a row in 2017 and 2018.
