= The Albuquerque Tribune =

Newspaper published in Albuquerque, New Mexico

- The July 27, 2005 front page of The Albuquerque Tribune
- Type: Daily newspaper
- Format: Broadsheet
- Owner: E. W. Scripps Company
- Founder: Carl Magee
- Founded: 1922
- Ceased publication: February 23, 2008
- Language: English
- Headquarters: 7777 Jefferson NE; Albuquerque, New Mexico 87109 United States
- Circulation: 10,000 (when closure was announced)
- ISSN: 1097-2048
- Website: abqtrib.com

The Albuquerque Tribune was an afternoon newspaper in Albuquerque, New Mexico, founded in 1922 by Carlton Cole Magee as Magee's Independent. It was published in the afternoon and evening Monday through Saturday until closing in 2008.

== History ==
=== Origins ===
On June 22, 1922, Carlton Cole Magee, former owner and editor of the Albuquerque Journal, founded a new weekly paper in Albuquerque called Magee's Independent. While the paper remained unprofitable after nine months, Magee sought investors for a daily edition. In April 1923, Magee established a daily called the New Mexico State Tribune. In September 1923, Scripps-Howard acquired the Tribune from Magee, who stayed on as editor.

=== JOA ===
On February 20, 1933, in response to the Great Depression, the Tribune and Journal formed the nation's first joint operating agreement. The Albuquerque Publishing Company would operate both papers and be jointly owned by the paper's owners. The two printing and business departments were merged, but the editorial teams remained separate. The Journal published six days a week in the morning, and the Tribune published six days a week in the evening.

=== Closure ===
In 1988, circulation peaked at 42,000, but continued to decline over the decades. In summer 2007, E. W. Scripps Company, the paper's owner, announced the Tribune would if a buyer was not found. D.W. Turner, a local public relations and advertising firm, entered negotiations, but their offer was later withdrawn. After a seven-month search, no deals emerged. The Tribune ceased on February 23, 2008. By then circulation had fallen to 10,000, while the Albuquerque Journal stood at 106,000. Governor Bill Richardson of New Mexico declared the paper's last day "Albuquerque Tribune Day" in his state, to "celebrate the Tribune's long and proud history and its honorable service to the state."

Although the JOA ended when Scripps shut down the newspaper, Scripps retained its stake (about 40%) in Albuquerque Publishing Company, giving Scripps a corresponding share in any future Albuquerque Journal profits. Scripps had not offered to sell its share in the JOA when it attempted to sell the paper, something that Editor & Publisher noted was another factor in Scripps' inability to find a buyer for the Tribune.

== Pulitzer ==
Eileen Welsome of The Albuquerque Tribune won the Pulitzer Prize for National Reporting in 1994 for her series entitled "The Plutonium Experiment", a series about human radiation experiments that took place at the Walter E. Fernald State School of Massachusetts, among other locations.

== Logo ==
The paper's logo and the logo of the entire Scripps-Howard newspaper chain, depicting a lighthouse, was inspired by founder Magee's original slogan: "Give Light and the People Will Find Their Own Way"; the slogan had been adopted from Dante.
