= Artesia Daily Press =

Daily newspaper published in Artesia, New Mexico

- Type: Daily newspaper
- Owner: El Rito Media
- Founder(s): Lincoln O'Brien; James K. Green
- Founded: June 2, 1954; 71 years ago
- Language: English
- City: Artesia, New Mexico
- Country: United States
- OCLC number: 15615995
- Website: artesianews.com

The Artesia Daily Press is a newspaper in Artesia, New Mexico, United States.

== History ==
On June 2, 1954, Lincoln O'Brien, president of New Mexico Newspapers, Inc., first published the Artesia Daily Press. It was launched as a rival to the much older Artesia Advocate. O'Brien owned papers in Tucumcari, Las Vegas, Gallup and Farmington. James K. Green was made publisher of the Daily Press. He was an investor in the company was publisher of the Farmington Daily Times. In 1956, O'Brien bought the Advocate and absorbed it into the Daily Press.

In 1957, O'Brien sold the paper to Graham M. Dean and his wife Ruth, owners of the Ashland Daily Tidings and Siskiyou Daily News. Green stayed on as publisher. In 1966, Dean acquired the Deming Headlight and Deming Graphic. In 1970, Green purchased the three New Mexican papers from Dean.

In 1973, O'Brien was inducted into the New Mexico Press Association Hall of Fame. In 1975, Green bought the Ruidoso News, and in 1986 was inducted into the NMPA Hall of Fame. In 1988, the Green family sold the News, Headlight and El Defensor-Chieftain to Jack Kent Cooke, owner of the Washington Redskins and the Los Angeles Daily News. Green died in 2006 at age 91, and the Daily Press was then solely owned by his son Walt Green. His widow Lajuana Green died two years later. After 70 years of ownership by the Green family, El Rito Media acquired the Daily Press in 2023.
