= Newspaper endorsements in the 2004 United States presidential election =

During the 2004 United States presidential election, the online edition of Editor & Publisher, a journal covering the North American newspaper industry, tabulated newspaper endorsements for the two major candidates, Republican incumbent George W. Bush and Democratic challenger John Kerry. As of November 1, 2004, their tally shows the following:

Endorsements
	2004	2000
		Bush	Gore	Neutral, Unknown
Bush	190	94	8	88
Kerry	208	43	94	71

They note that 43 papers which had endorsed Bush for the 2000 election switched to endorse Kerry for 2004, whereas 8 papers which had endorsed Al Gore in 2000 switched to endorse Bush for 2004.

They also listed 18 papers, all of which endorsed Bush in 2000, that declared their neutrality for the 2004 election.

They note that the total daily circulation of the papers that have endorsed each candidate is 20,791,336 for Kerry vs. 14,455,046 for Bush.

The following is a partial list of the endorsements:

- Choose not to endorse anyone (all backed Bush in 2000):
  - Cleveland Plain Dealer
  - Detroit News
  - Harrisburg, Pennsylvania Patriot-News
  - New Orleans Times-Picayune
  - Scranton, Pennsylvania Times
  - Tampa, Florida Tribune
  - Winston-Salem, North Carolina Journal
- For George W. Bush:
  - Amarillo Globe-News
  - Austin American-Statesman
  - Birmingham, Alabama News
  - Bluefield, West Virginia Daily Telegraph
  - Bloomington, Illinois Pantagraph
  - Canton The Repository
  - Chicago Tribune
  - Carlsbad, New Mexico Current-Argus
  - Carbondale, Illinois Southern Illiosian
  - Cedar Rapids, Iowa Gazette
  - Champaign, Illinois News-Gazette
  - Clarksville, Tennessee Leaf-Chronicle
  - Columbus Dispatch
  - Cincinnati Enquirer
  - Cincinnati Post
  - Dallas Morning News
  - Denver Rocky Mountain News
  - Denver Post
  - Evansville, Indiana Courier & Press
  - Easton, Maryland Star Democrat
  - Easton, Pennsylvania Express-Times
  - El Paso, Texas Times
  - Fargo, North Dakota Forum
  - Farmington, New Mexico Daily Times
  - Findlay, Ohio Courier
  - Fredericksburg, Virginia The Free Lance–Star
  - Freeport, Illinois Standard Journal
  - Fort Worth Star-Telegram
  - Fort Smith, Arkansas Southwest Times Record
  - Grand Junction, Colorado Daily Sentinel
  - Houston Chronicle
  - Indianapolis Star
  - Lakeland, Florida Ledger
  - Las Vegas Review-Journal
  - Las Cruces, New Mexico Sun-News
  - Little Rock, Arkansas Arkansas Democrat-Gazette
  - Lowell, Massachusetts The Sun
  - Manchester, New Hampshire Union-Leader
  - Mason City, Iowa Globe-Gazette
  - Midland, Michigan Midland Daily News
  - Mobile Register
  - New Philadelphia, Ohio Times Reporter
  - New York Daily News
  - New York Sun
  - New York Post
  - Ocala, Florida Star-Banner
  - Oklahoma City, Oklahoma Oklahoman
  - Omaha, Nebraska World-Herald
  - Parkersburg, West Virginia The Parkersburg News
  - Parkersburg, West Virginia The Parkersburg Sentinel
  - Phoenix Arizona Republic
  - Pittsburgh, Pennsylvania Pittsburgh Tribune-Review
  - Pontiac, Michigan The Oakland Press
  - Poughkeepsie, New York Journal
  - Pueblo, Colorado The Pueblo Chieftain
  - Richmond, Virginia Times-Dispatch
  - Riverside, California Press-Enterprise
  - Saint Joseph, Michigan Herald-Palladium
  - Salt Lake Tribune
  - San Antonio Express-News
  - San Diego Union-Tribune
  - Savannah, Georgia Morning News
  - Sioux City, Iowa Journal
  - Sioux Falls, South Dakota Argus Leader
  - Spartanburg, South Carolina Herald-Journal
  - St. Paul, Minnesota Pioneer Press
  - Stockton, California Record
  - Tulsa, Oklahoma World
  - Vacaville, California Reporter
  - Vancouver, Washington The Columbian
  - York, Pennsylvania Daily Record
  - Washington Times
  - Everett, Washington "The Everett Herald"
- For John Kerry:
  - Akron, Ohio Beacon-Journal
  - Albuquerque Tribune
  - Allentown Morning Call
  - Anchorage, Alaska Daily News
  - Atlanta Journal-Constitution
  - Baltimore, Maryland The Sun
  - Bangor, Maine Daily News
  - Bismarck, North Dakota Tribune
  - Boise, Idaho Idaho Statesman
  - Boston Globe
  - Bradenton, Florida Herald
  - Bremerton, Washington Sun
  - Bridgewater, New Jersey Courier-News
  - Buffalo News
  - Charleston, West Virginia Gazette
  - Charlotte, North Carolina Observer
  - Chattanooga, Tennessee Times
  - Chicago Sun-Times
  - Columbia, Missouri Daily Tribune
  - Concord, New Hampshire Monitor
  - Crawford, Texas Lone Star Iconoclast
  - Davenport, Iowa Quad-City Times
  - Dayton, Ohio Daily News
  - Daytona Beach, Florida News Journal
  - Delaware News Journal
  - Des Moines Register
  - Detroit Free Press
  - Duluth, Minnesota News Tribune
  - Durango, Colorado Herald
  - Economist
  - Everett, Washington Herald
  - Financial Times
  - Falls Church, Virginia News-Press
  - Flint, Michigan Journal
  - Fort Collins, Colorado Coloradoan
  - Fresno Bee
  - Grand Forks, North Dakota Herald
  - Hackensack, New Jersey Record of Bergen County
  - Honolulu Advertiser
  - The Idaho Statesman
  - The Ithaca Journal
  - Jackson, Tennessee Sun
  - Kansas City, Missouri Star
  - Lansing, Michigan State Journal
  - Las Vegas Sun
  - Lexington, Kentucky Herald-Leader
  - Long Island, New York Newsday
  - Louisville, Kentucky Courier-Journal
  - Medford, Oregon Mail-Tribune
  - Memphis, Tennessee Commercial Appeal
  - Merced, California Sun-Star
  - Miami Herald
  - Minneapolis Star Tribune
  - Modesto, California Bee
  - Montgomery, Alabama Advertiser
  - Muskegon, Michigan Chronicle
  - Myrtle Beach, South Carolina The Sun News
  - Nashua, New Hampshire Telegraph
  - Nashville, Tennessee The Tennessean
  - The Nation
  - Newark, New Jersey Star-Ledger
  - Newport News, Virginia Daily Press
  - The New Republic
  - New York Times Union
  - The New Yorker
  - New York Times
  - Olympia, Washington Olympian
  - Orlando Sentinel
  - Palm Beach Post
  - Philadelphia Inquirer
  - Philadelphia, Pennsylvania Daily News
  - Pittsburgh, Pennsylvania Post-Gazette
  - Port Huron, Michigan Times Herald
  - Portland, Maine Herald-Press
  - Portland Oregonian
  - Raleigh, North Carolina News and Observer
  - Reno, Nevada Gazette-Journal
  - Roanoke, Virginia Times
  - Rockford, Illinois Register Star
  - Sacramento Bee
  - San Francisco Chronicle
  - San Jose Mercury-News
  - Santa Rosa, California The Press Democrat
  - St. Louis Post-Dispatch
  - St. Louis American
  - St. Petersburg Times
  - Seattle Times
  - Seattle Post-Intelligencer
  - The Sheboygan Press
  - Springfield, Massachusetts Republican
  - Springfield, Missouri News-Leader
  - State College, Pennsylvania Centre Daily Times
  - Tacoma, Washington News Tribune
  - Toledo, Ohio Blade
  - Traverse City, Michigan Record-Eagle
  - Trenton, New Jersey Times
  - Tucson Daily Star
  - Vallejo, California Times-Herald
  - Washington Post
  - Waco, Texas Tribune-Herald
  - Wilkes-Barre, Pennsylvania Times Leader and Citizen's Voice
  - Woodbury, New Jersey Gloucester County Times
  - Worcester, Massachusetts Telegram and Gazette

== See also ==
- Newspaper endorsements in the United States presidential primaries
