= Valencia County News-Bulletin =

Weekly newspaper published in Belen, New Mexico

- Type: Weekly newspaper
- Owner: Journal Publishing Company
- Founder: P.A. Speckmann
- Publisher: Clara Garcia
- Founded: 1912; 114 years ago
- Language: English
- City: Belen, New Mexico
- Country: United States
- ISSN: 1071-3492
- Website: news-bulletin.com

The Valencia County News-Bulletin is a weekly newspaper in Belen, New Mexico, that was established in 1912. It is owned by Number 9 Media, a subsidiary of the Albuquerque Journal.

== History ==
In December 1912, P.A. Speckmann founded the Belen News. In March 1914, E.H. "Henry" Salazar, owner of the Hispano-American Publishing Co., bought the News and appointed M.C. Garcia as editor. Salazar was the stepson of William H. Manderfield, an early owner of The Santa Fe New Mexican, and founded two Spanish-language papers called La Voz de Pueblo and El Independiente. He was also appointed a land receiver at Fort Sumner in Guadalupe County. In October 1914, Salazar died after being struck by a cow.

Years later the News eventually fell into the hands of county school superintendent Saturnino Baca and his son Elfego G. Baca, a police officer who fatally shot a man in self-defense. In May 1946, George W. Perkins founded the Belen Bulletin. In December 1946, Edwin J. Lewis bought the News from Elfego G. Baca after he was elected county sheriff. In January 1947, Carter M. Waid became co-publisher of the Bulletin. In March 1947, the Bulletin and the News merged to form the News-Bulletin. Waid became editor, Lewis became business manager and Perkins became plant superintendent.

Carter bought out Lewis in 1953, only for him to sell his entire stock in the business to Lewis in 1976. The paper was then operated by the company Modern Press, which was managed by Thomas E. Lewis. The News-Bulletin was acquired by Meredith Corporation in 1980, Harte-Hanks Communications in 1983, Worrell Enterprises in 1986, brothers Walt and Ken Green in 1988, and Cooke Media Group in 1989. A new $100,000 printing press was installed a year later.

Cooke Media Group was owned by Jack Kent Cooke and it also published the Los Angeles Daily News. Cooke's six New Mexican papers were operated by Raljon Publishing, a subsidiary managed by his two sons, Ralph and John Cooke. In 1994, the News-Bulletin was sold to WorldWest LLC. That same year former owner Carter, who served for two years as town mayor, died.

In 2001, Journal Publishing Co., publisher of the Albuquerque Journal, acquired the News-Bulletin and El Defensor-Chieftain from WorldWest. The papers were operated under a subsidiary called Number Nine Media Inc. In 2025, the paper's editor and publisher, Clara Garcia, was inducted into the New Mexico Press Association’s Hall of Fame.
