= Santa Fe Reporter =

Alternative weekly newspaper in New Mexico

The Santa Fe Reporter

- AAN award-winning cover of the Jan. 31 - Feb. 6, 2018 Santa Fe Reporter, by Anson Stevens-Bollen
- Type: Weekly newspaper
- Format: Alternative weekly
- Owner: Pat Davis
- Publisher: Julie Ann Grimm
- Editor: Julie Ann Grimm
- Founded: 1974
- Language: English
- Headquarters: 1512 Pacheco St. D105. Santa Fe, NM 87505; United States
- Circulation: 17,500 (as of 2016)
- Price: free
- Sister newspapers: Roswell Daily Record
- ISSN: 0744-477X
- Website: sfreporter.com

The Santa Fe Reporter (SFR) is an alternative weekly newspaper published in Santa Fe, New Mexico, United States. First published in 1974, it features reports on local news, politics, art and culture, and is published once a week on Wednesdays.

== Features and distribution ==
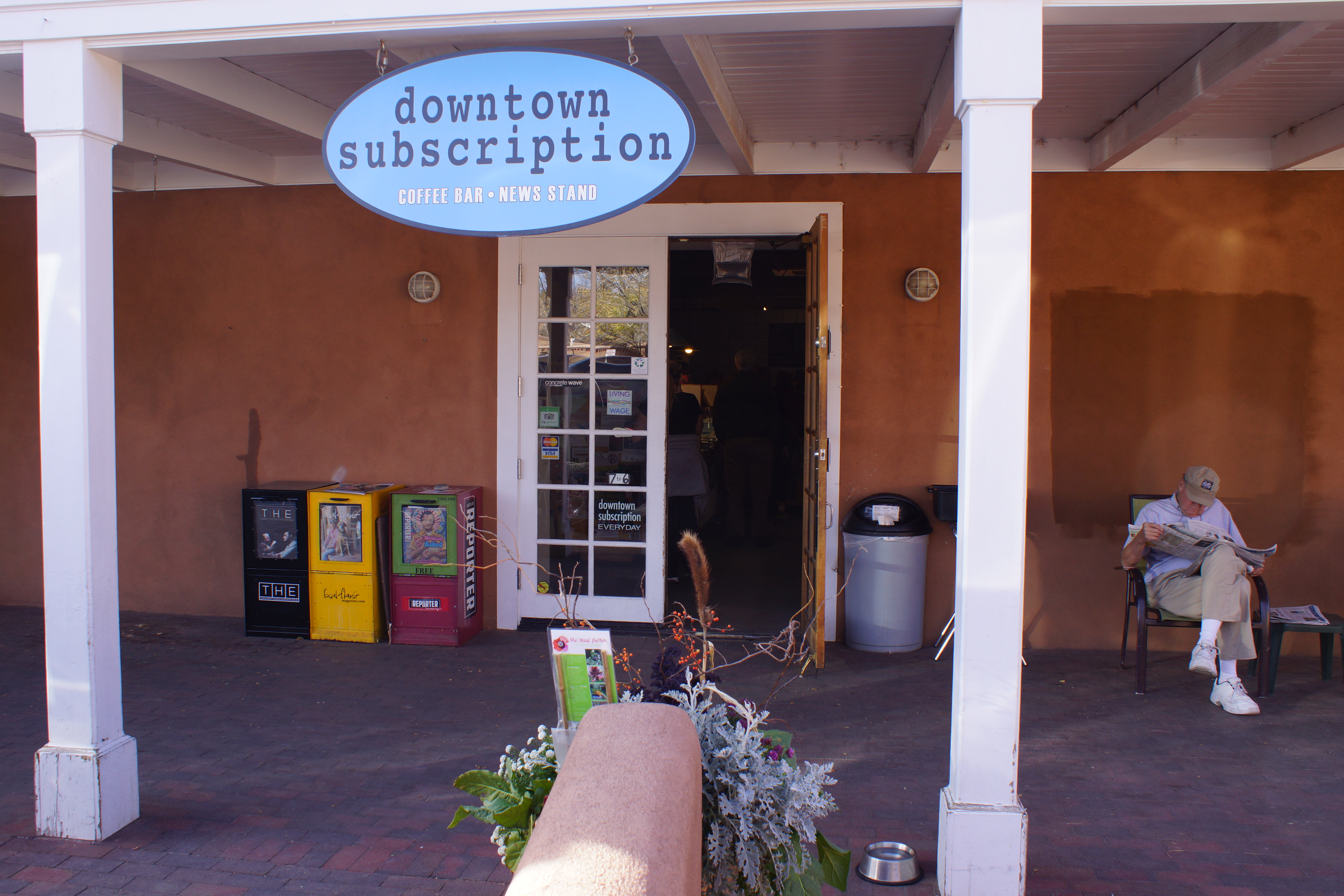
newspaper vending machine

The Santa Fe Reporter publishes three glossy seasonal guides, including its magazine-style supplement, the Restaurant Guide. The paper also hosts several events in Santa Fe each year, such as expos and parties.

== Ownership and staff ==
The newspaper was first owned by Richard McCord and Laurel Knowles. The two sold it in 1988 to Hope Aldrich Rockefeller. It was sold again in 1997 to Richard Meeker and Mark Zusman, owners of the Portland, Oregon-based City of Roses Newspaper Company which also publishes Willamette Week and Indy Week. In 2024, the newspaper was sold to Pat Davis.

Since September 2016, the paper's publisher & editor has been Julie Ann Grimm, with Anna Maggiore serving as associate publisher and advertising director. Grimm had previously been editor of the paper since August 2013. Alex De Vore has been covering music, arts and culture for the Reporter since 2008, and became culture editor in 2016.

== Notable stories ==
In 2007, Dan Frosch, now with The New York Times, won the Association of Alternative Newsweeklies' first-place prize (for under 60,000 circulation) for Investigative Reporting for his 15-part series, "The Wexford Files". The story, which investigated health care in New Mexico prisons, was instrumental in governor Bill Richardson's decision to end New Mexico's contract with Wexford.

In 2010, Corey Pein wrote the story "Khalsa vs Khalsa", the first article to examine the disputes within the 3HO community.

In 2013, the Santa Fe Reporter filed a lawsuit against New Mexico Governor Susana Martinez, alleging violations of the state's Inspection of Public Records Act as well as a violation of the Free Press clause of the New Mexico Constitution. Attorneys for the newspaper and the government argued in court in March 2017, and Judge Sara Singleton ruled in the case from her retirement in December of that year that the governor had broken the records law, but her actions did not violate the Constitution.

The Reporter works with a sister nonprofit, the New Mexico Fund for Public Interest Journalism, to provide journalism training for students. Its 2019 cohort was honored in 2020 by the Association of Alternative Newsmedia for the collaboration that covered sustainability programs at the Santa Fe Community College: “Roadmap to Resilience” by Olivia Abeyta, Max Looft, Anna Girdner, and James Taylor under the direction of mentor and educator Julia Goldberg.

== Awards ==
The Society of Professional Journalists Colorado chapter's "Top of the Rocky's" contest listed nine Santa Fe Reporter stories among its best in the region in 2017.

In 2008, at the Association of Alternative Newsweeklies (AAN) awards ceremony the Santa Fe Reporter received seven awards for editorial layout, illustration, arts criticism, columns and blogs. In 2009, the Reporter won five AAN awards, for its politics blog, for illustrations, for food writing, for "Innovation" and for the 2008 election blog, "Swing State of Mind".
