= Roswell Daily Record =

Newspaper in Roswell, New Mexico

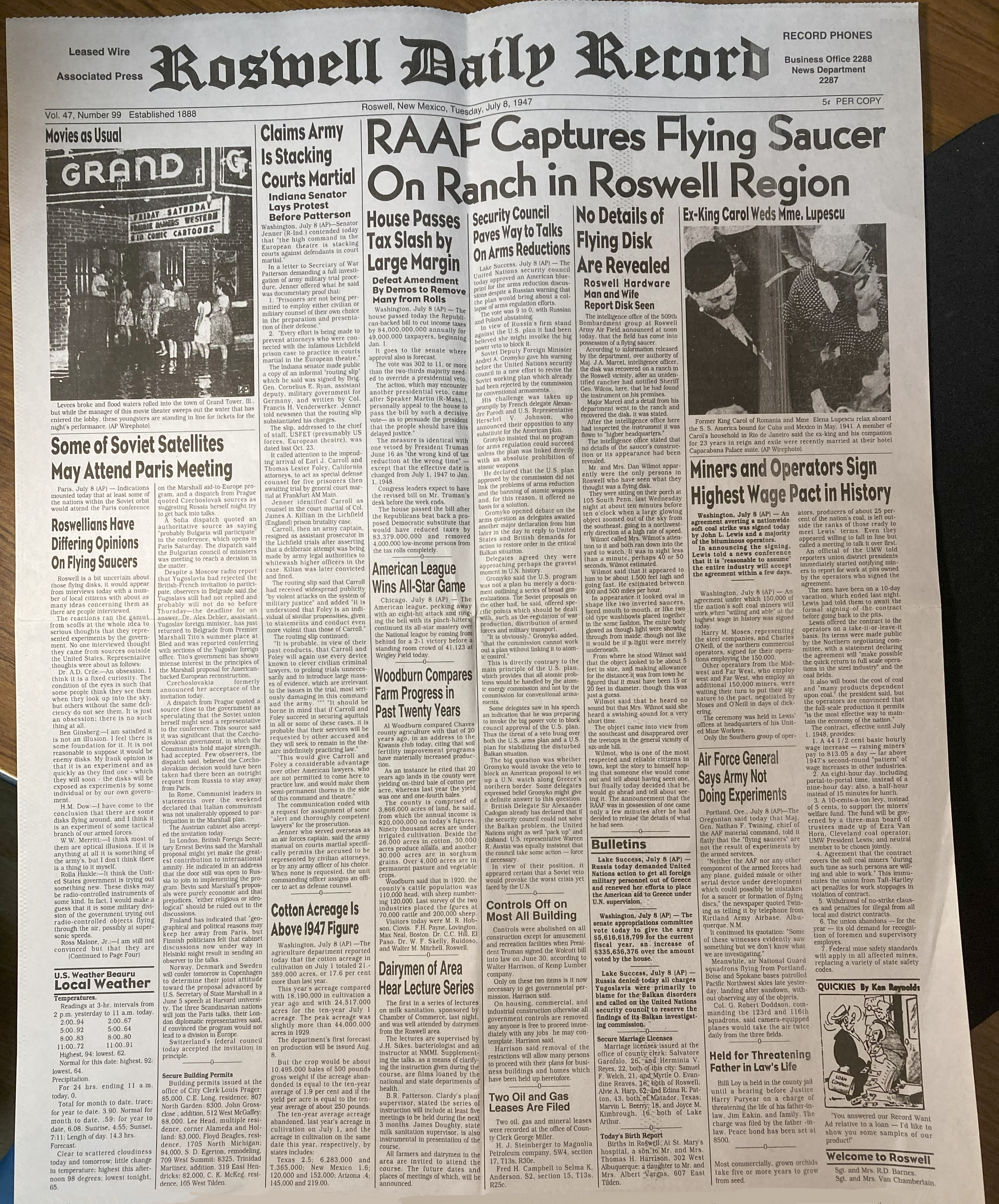
- July 8, 1947, issue, featuring a story announcing the Roswell Army Air Field "capture" of a "flying saucer" from a ranch near Roswell.
- Type: Daily newspaper
- Format: Broadsheet
- Owner(s): Roswell Daily Record, Inc. (Beck Trust - Marjorie S Beck)
- Publisher: Barbara Beck
- General manager: Saralei Fajardo
- Founded: 1891; 135 years ago
- Language: English
- Headquarters: 2301 North Main Street; Roswell, New Mexico 88201
- Sister newspapers: Santa Fe Reporter
- ISSN: 2379-0237
- OCLC number: 427420996
- Website: rdrnews.com

The Roswell Daily Record is a local newspaper located in Roswell, New Mexico, and has a circulation of less than 12,000. The paper is well known in the UFO community because it reported the alleged Roswell UFO crash in 1947.

== History ==
In March 1891, Joseph D. Lea founded the Roswell Record. Lucius Dills was editor for several years. In January 1899, Lea and Dills sold the Record to Elmer O. Creighton and A.A. Burnett. A few months later, Burnett exited the business.

In September 1902, Charles E. Mason and his brother-in-law, Professor Harvey F.M. Bear, bought the paper from Creighton. It was soon expanded from a weekly publication into a daily publication. In April 1903, the paper's printers went on strike. Two years later in February 1905, Bear died, at which point his widow, Grace Thorpe Bear, incorporated a stock company and transferred ownership of the Record to the newly created enterprise. In April 1905, former owner Creighton died. George A. Puckett succeeded Bear as editor, and he died in December 1909.

Mason eventually became editor. In February 1932, Arthur W. Cooley bought the Record. The other new minority owners were T.N. Gretzer and Thomas B. Shearman. Mason and Grace Thorpe Bear retained interests. In 1937, Shearman took over as publisher, and two years later in April 1940, Grace Thorpe Bear died. In May 1949, the paper installed a new printing press, and in September of that same year, the Record acquired and absorbed the Roswell Morning Dispatch.

Shearman, who eventually acquired full ownership, was succeeded as publisher by his son-in-law, Robert Hallum Beck, in 1955. Beck's father, Robert Beck, died in 1987, and Shearman died a year later in 1988. Around that time, R.H. Beck retired and was succeeded by his son Robert Cory Beck, who died in 2006. Charles Fischer ran the paper until Barbara Beck, sister of R.C. Beck, took charge in 2015. R.H. Beck died in 2018, and his wife, Marjorie Shearman Beck, died in 2021.

=== Decline and relaunch ===
In August 2020, the Daily Record eliminated its Saturday edition. In November 2023, the paper announced it would reduce its print frequency from five to three issues a week and eliminate its Sunday comics section. In October 2025, the Daily Record announced the paper would be printed by The Santa Fe New Mexican. In May 2026, the Daily Record switched from carrier to postal delivery.

In July 2026, the paper announced it would cease publication. Two days later, however, Pat Davis and the other members of the ownership group operating the Santa Fe Reporter reached an agreement with Barbara Beck and Saralei Fajardo to purchase the Daily Record and relaunch it.

== See also ==
- List of newspapers in New Mexico
- Roswell incident
