= Silver City Daily Press and Independent =

Daily newspaper in Silver City, New Mexico

Coordinates: 32°46′17″N 108°16′40″W

The Silver City Daily Press and Independent

- The paper's Wednesday, March 11, 2015 front page
- Type: Daily newspaper
- Format: Tabloid
- Owner(s): The Silver City Independent Publishing Company, LLC
- Publisher: Nickolas C. Seibel
- Editor-in-chief: Nickolas C. Seibel
- Managing editor: Dean Thompson
- Staff writers: 6
- Founded: 1896; 130 years ago (as The Silver City Independent)
- Language: English
- Headquarters: 300 W. Market St. Silver City, New Mexico, United States
- Circulation: 5,000 Daily
- Price: USD 1.00 Tuesday, Thursday & Saturday
- ISSN: 0891-7981
- OCLC number: 26786025
- Website: scdailypress.com

The Silver City Daily Press and Independent is a four-day daily newspaper that serves the Silver City, New Mexico area of the United States. Founded in 1896 as the weekly Silver City Independent, the paper was purchased by the Ely family in 1934. In 1935, Colonel Clyde Ely renamed the paper the Silver City Daily Press and Independent and converted it into a daily newspaper. In 2007, the newspaper received the Mark Twain Award from the New Mexico Associated Press Managing Editors for their outstanding member cooperation in 2006. Since the Great Recession, the newspaper has outsourced its printing, increased its Internet presence, discontinued its membership in the Associated Press and joined an 11-member New Mexico newspaper exchange. The name, archives and website of the Daily Press were purchased by Silver City Independent Publishing Company in April 2014, marking its first non-Ely family ownership since its conversion to a daily newspaper.

== History ==
=== The weekly Silver City Independent ===
The Silver City Daily Press traces its origins to the 1896 establishment of the Silver City Independent, a weekly newspaper originally published on Tuesdays in Silver City, New Mexico. The Independent was founded and edited by George Norton, a pioneer merchant in the area, and published its first issue on June 30, 1896, as a "non-partisan, independent, progressive local newspaper." However, despite the name, even at its beginning the newspaper wasn't nonpartisan, at least not in the modern sense of the word. In a position statement published in the first issue of the Independent, Norton spelled out what the name of the newspaper was intended to signify: "Now where this paper will differ from the average democratic paper will be in this particular — while we are willing to laud its virtues, we shall hold it as our right and duty to criticize its follies. This will be regarded as bad party politics by dyed-in-the-wool democrats, and for this reason we have christened this paper the INDEPENDENT in order that our expressions may not be construed to be those of a strict party organ." The original incarnation of the Silver City Independent was, perhaps unsurprisingly given its location, dedicated to the cause of Free silver, and carried the slogan "Free and Unlimited Coinage 16 to 1." on its Page 2 masthead throughout its first two years of publication. Norton announced that "owing to continued ill health and pecuniary interests elsewhere," he had "disposed of The Independent, together with the good will and subscription list, to the Independent Publishing Co." in a Page 2 farewell letter published on February 15, 1898.

The new Independent Publishing Co. was owned and operated by William B. Walton, a Silver City attorney and Democratic politician, who combined his Grant County Democrat into the Independent, a combination that was advertised atop each edition through the end of 1898. The new publisher's first act was to publish an announcement just below his predecessor's farewell, announcing that "A radical change will at once be inaugurated in the political views of the Independent. The independent policy adopted by Mr. Norton finds no favor with the new management, and henceforth this paper will advocate the principles of the Democratic party as expressed in the Chicago platform, and will render staunch and active support to party interests, in national, territorial and county politics." Walton's Grant County Democrat held the printing contracts for Grant County government, which after the combination of the two papers made the Independent the official newspaper of Grant County. Walton continued to publish the newspaper for more than 35 years, until ill health forced him to put the paper up for sale, and on October 1, 1934, the Ely family purchased the Independent.

=== The daily Silver City Daily Press and Independent ===
On June 26, 1935, the Elys converted the paper into a daily, and renamed it the Silver City Daily Press and Independent. At that time, the Ely family also owned Gallup Independent and the Yuma Arizona Sentinel newspapers. The head of the family, Colonel Clyde Ely, appointed his son, William F. Ely, as the president and co-publisher of the Silver City Daily Press. The newspaper moved to the Silver City Daily Press building on Market Street following the building's completion in 1937.

In 1995, the paper's publisher William F. Ely died. At his death, his wife of 38 years, Betty Jane Head Ely, became the owner of the newspaper.

In 1999, the Silver City Daily Press took first place in the column writing category at the annual New Mexico Associated Press Managing Editors awards. The newspaper also took second place in both editorials and sports photo categories. A year later in 2000, the newspaper again took first place in the column writing category but additionally received first place for photo essay. They also received awards for their editorials, feature photos, and features columns in 2000.

At the end of 2006, owner and paper manager Betty Ely died, leaving ownership of the newspaper to her three children, Wes Lorier, Clyde Ely, and Christina (Tina) Ely. Before her death, Betty Ely passed control to Tina, who became the publisher and editor. When Mrs. Ely died, Tina noted that her mother passed control of the newspaper to her, "as my father did to her and my grandfather did to my dad. We will continue into generations to come. All my predecessors live on in the pages of our paper."

In October 2006, the Secretary of State of New Mexico placed approximately $13,500 worth of legal ads with The Silver City Daily Press in connection with the then-upcoming November elections. Five months later, the state failed to pay what was owed to the newspaper and its editor and publisher Tina Ely, a single mother, took out a second mortgage on her home to meet the newspaper's payroll due to the unpaid bill from the Secretary of State's Office. In addition, federal auditors were reviewing these and other expenditures by former Secretary of State Rebecca Vigil-Giron, whose subsequent August 2009 indictment on charges embezzlement of federal money meant for voter education were ordered dropped in 2012 by a New Mexico District Judge.

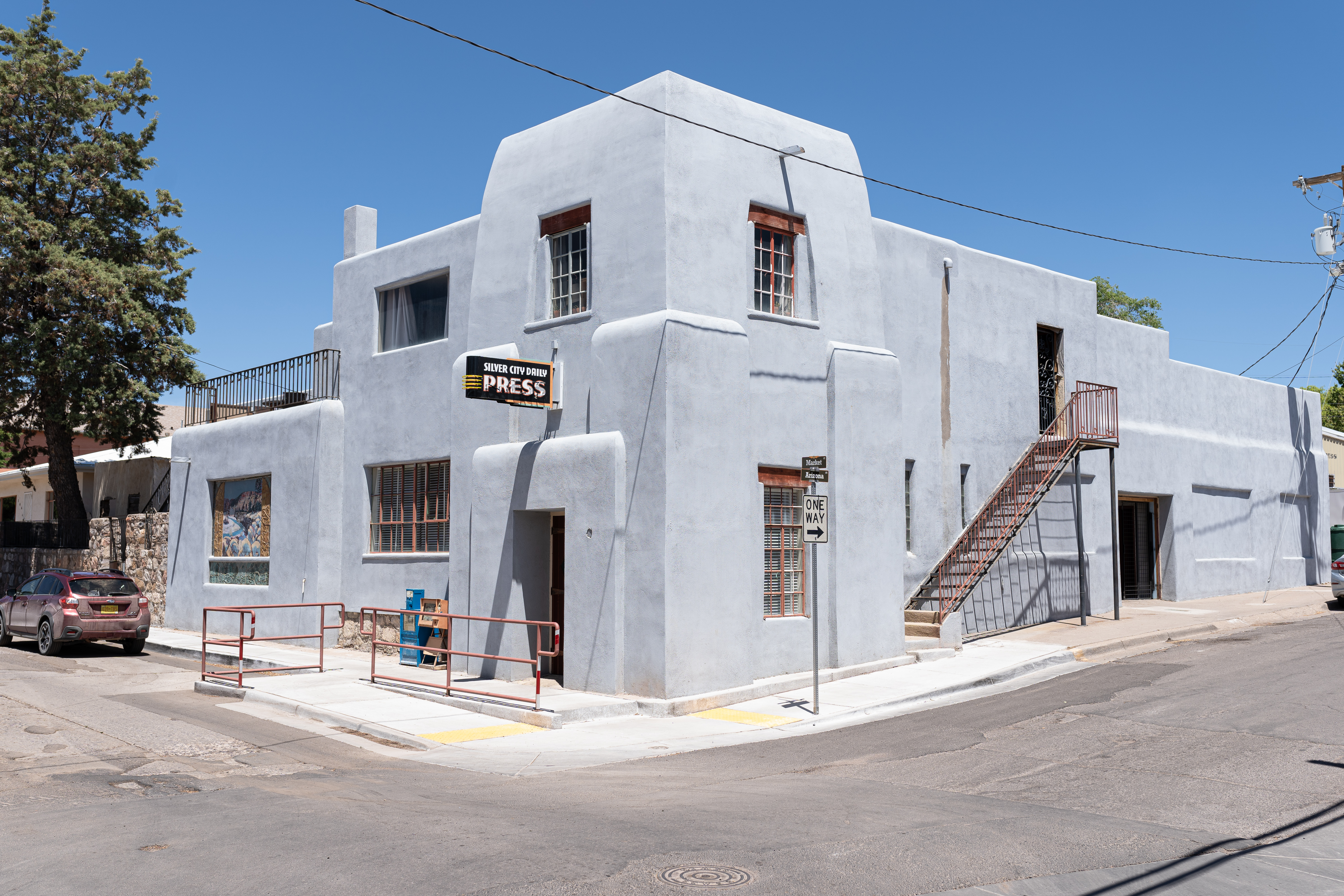
Silver City Daily Press Building at 300 W. Market St.

In April 2007, the Silver City Daily Press received the Mark Twain Award from the New Mexico Associated Press Managing Editors (NMAPME). First awarded by NMAPME in 1996, the Silver City Daily Press receive the Mark Twain Award in 2007 for their outstanding member cooperation throughout the year 2006.

In 2008, the newspaper switched from using its own printing presses to outsourcing the job of printing the daily paper to Signature Offset, a printing firm located in Las Cruces, New Mexico. The decision to hire an outside printing house was based on the cost of upgrading the press equipment at the Silver City Daily Press to digital technology. At that time, the contents of the newspaper were sent to Signature Offset at 10 a.m. each day and distributed around Silver City by the afternoon of that same day. Seven months later, the newspaper discontinued its Saturday edition due to the Great Recession, postal rates, and printing costs, and began devoting more time to its online edition. Joseph "Joby" Aguirre, one of the pressman laid off from the Silver City Daily Press in 2008 when the newspaper discontinued its local printing operation, went on to be named 2010 Police Officer of the Year by Silver City Police.

In 2013, the Silver City Daily Press became one of 11 member newspapers of the Community News Exchange. In addition to receiving the ability to publish content in an average of 67,000 newspapers per publication day, the Silver City Daily Press obtained publishing rights access through the exchange to small-town community news from member newspapers around New Mexico. As described by Community News Exchange editor Tom McDonald, "The objective is to not only provide smaller newspapers with a news-sharing system, but to deliver to them quality content that supplements their local news-gathering operations."

On April 25, 2014, the Daily Press announced both in a front-page story and on its website that it would cease publication after its next issue, which would be the following Monday, April 28. The story cited declining advertising revenues as the primary reason for the impending closure. After reading the announcement in the paper, former Daily Press General Manager Nickolas Seibel assembled a group of local investors to back him in a purchase of some of the newspaper's assets, including the name, website, archives and a few pieces of equipment. The potential deal was announced in what was to be the newspaper's final issue on Monday, April 28, and the newspaper was first published under the ownership of Seibel's Silver City Independent Publishing Company, LLC, on Tuesday, April 29 — without missing a day of publication.

== See also ==
- List of newspapers in New Mexico
