= The Santa Fe New Mexican =

Newspaper in Santa Fe, New Mexico

- Latin: veritas magna est et praevalebit

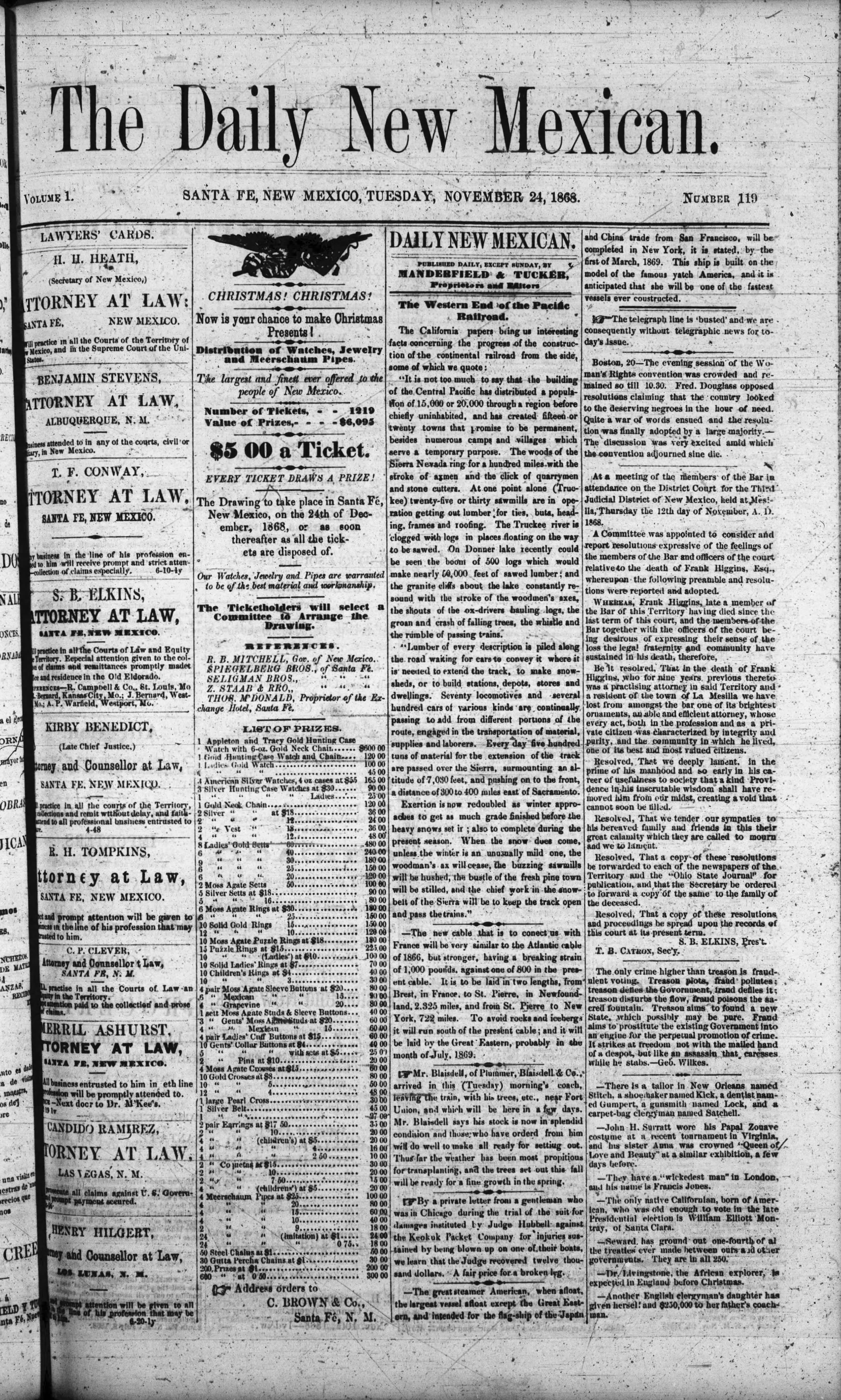
- Front page of The Daily New Mexican for November 24, 1868
- Type: Daily newspaper
- Format: Broadsheet
- Owner(s): The New Mexican, Inc.
- Founders: E.T. Davies; W.E. Jones
- Publisher: Patrick Dorsey
- President: Robin McKinney Martin
- Editor: Bill Church
- Founded: November 28, 1849
- Language: English; Spanish (infrequently); Spanglish (infrequently)
- Headquarters: 150 Washington Ave. Santa Fe, NM 87501; United States
- Circulation: 23,000
- Sister newspapers: Taos News
- ISSN: 2474-4360
- Website: www.santafenewmexican.com

The Santa Fe New Mexican or simply The New Mexican is a daily newspaper published in Santa Fe, New Mexico. Dubbed "the West's oldest newspaper," its first issue was printed on November 28, 1849.

The New Mexican is printed on a KBA Comet press housed at a production building officially completed on November 1, 2004. The plant is located at One New Mexican Plaza in Santa Fe. The facility prints other papers including the Albuquerque Journal, and The New York Times. The paper also publishes Pasatiempo, a weekly magazine covering arts, entertainment and culture.

== History ==
On November 28, 1849, E.T. Davies and W.E. Jones published the first edition of The New Mexican. A year later Ceran St. Vrain was listed as publisher. In 1863, Dr. Charles Lieb relaunched the paper, printed in both English and Spanish. He was soon succeeded by Charles P. Clever, followed by William H. Manderfield. In 1864, Thomas S. Tucker became a co-owner. In 1868, the paper was expanded from a weekly into a daily.

In 1881, E.B. Purcell bought the paper from Manderfield and Tucker. He discontinued it two years later. A week later W.H. Bailhache, owner of the Albuquerque Review, relocated his paper to Santa Fe and relaunched it as The New Mexican Review. After a month, Charles B. Hayward acquired the business switched the paper from a morning to an evening publication. He soon renamed it back to The New Mexican and in 1885 sold it to T.W. Collier. George Cross was hired as editor. In 1888, a fire damaged the paper's office and destroyed early issues of the paper.

In 1897, Cross retired and Col. Max Frost succeeded him. In 1909, Frost retired due to illness and was succeeded by his assistant editor Paul A.F. Walter. He died later that year. Walter, along with Solomon Luna and Holm O. Bursum, owned stock in the business.

In 1912, New York millionaire Bronson M. Cutting bought The New Mexican and hired former governor Miguel Antonio Otero as managing editor. After he died in a 1935 airplane crash, his newspaper was willed to his secretary Jesus M. Baca. The paper was acquired by Oscar S. Stauffer in 1937, Frank C. Rand, Jr. in 1940, and Robert M. McKinney in 1948.

McKinney started a weekly paper in Taos called the Taos News in 1959, and years later merged his company with Gannett in 1976. The contract stipulated McKinney retained editorial and managerial control of The New Mexican. In April 1978, his daughter Robin McKinney Martin reacquired the Taos News from Gannett. In September 1978, McKinney sued Gannett for breach of contract, seeking $20 million, The New Mexican returned, or both.

In 1989, McKinney bought back the paper in exchange for his 800,000 in Gannett stock worth $33.5 million. In 2001, McKinney died, and his daughter Martin inherited his business. In 2011, the company acquired the Santa Fe Thrifty Nickel. In 2014, Martin was inducted into the New Mexico Press Association's Hall of Fame.

In 2015, The New Mexican was named "Daily Newspaper of the Year" (circulation under 30,000 category) by the Local Media Association, a national organization of television, newspaper and radio companies.

== Notable staff ==
- Tony Hillerman, served as executive editor in the early 1950s and was a New York Times bestselling author.

== See also ==
- List of newspapers in New Mexico
