= Albuquerque Journal =

Daily newspaper in New Mexico, US

- Type: Daily newspaper
- Format: Broadsheet
- Owner: Journal Publishing Company
- Founder: E.W. Deer
- Publisher: Bill Lang
- Editor-in-chief: James Bennett
- Founded: 1880 (as the Golden Gate)
- Language: English
- Headquarters: 7777 Jefferson Street NE; Albuquerque, New Mexico; 87109
- Circulation: 21,100 Average print circulation
- ISSN: 1526-5137
- OCLC number: 27038485
- Website: Official website

The Albuquerque Journal is the largest newspaper in the U.S. state of New Mexico, and competes with The Santa Fe New Mexican and the Las Cruces Sun-News. The Journal is published daily. The Journal Publishing Co. also operates other regional papers including the El Defensor Chieftain in Socorro, the Rio Rancho Observer and Valencia County News-Bulletin.

== History ==
In June 1880, E.W. Deer founded the Golden Gate, a weekly newspaper in Albuquerque, New Mexico. A month later he died from tuberculosis. That September, the Journal Publishing Company was organized, acquired the paper and relaunched it as the Albuquerque Daily Journal on October 14, 1880. Captain James A. Spradling was named managing editor.

In February 1881, Spradling retired. W.H. Bailhache took over as general manager and W.M. Patton as editor. That March, Tom Hughes bought the Journal. In 1886, E.S. Clark, nephew of Elias S. Stover, acquired the paper. In 1887, the Journal was acquired by John G. Albright, owner of the Albuquerque Daily Democrat. In 1895, ownership of the papers was transferred to a corporation with A.A. Grant as principal stock owner. W.S. Burke was named editor. In 1899, the two papers were merged to form the Albuquerque Journal-Democrat.

In March 1903, manager George F. Albright resigned and was replaced by D.A. MacPherson and L.A. Grant who switched the paper's affiliation to Independent Republican. That October, the paper was renamed to the Albuquerque Morning Journal. In 1913, M.L. Fox became editor. In 1920, Carl C. Magee acquired the paper. In 1922, Magee sold it for $200,000 to Sidney M. Well. Magee then founded a rival paper called Magee's Independent, which later became The Albuquerque Tribune. In 1926, the Journal merged with The Evening Herald and Tom M. Pepperday was named publisher. Under his watch, the paper branched out into broadcasting, leasing the state's oldest radio station, KOB, in 1932, before buying it outright in 1936. He built the state's first television station, KOB-TV, in 1948.

Circulation over three decades grew from 7,000 to 40,000. In 1956, Pepperday died. His son-in-law C. Thompson Lang took over the paper and published it until his death in 1971. His son Thompson "Tom" H. Lang became publisher and handed over the paper to his brother William "Bill" P. Lang in 2012. T.H. Lang died in 2015.

== Awards ==
In 1990, Tamar Stieber, a reporter at the Albuquerque Journal, won the Pulitzer Prize for Specialized Reporting for her reporting on a link between the dietary supplement Tryptophan and a rare blood disorder.

== See also ==
- Media in Albuquerque, New Mexico
