= List of newspapers in Wisconsin =

This is a list of print newspapers in Wisconsin. There were 362 newspapers in Wisconsin at the beginning of 2020.

== Daily and nondaily newspapers ==
Newspaper	City	Publisher/Parent company
The Tribune-Phonograph	Abbotsford	TP Printing
Algoma Record-Herald	Algoma	USA Today Co.
Buffalo County Journal	Alma	Valley Publications
Altoona Star	Altoona	Altoona Star, Inc.
Antigo Daily Journal	Antigo	Adams Publishing Group
The Post-Crescent	Appleton	USA Today Co.
Pecatonica Valley Leader	Argyle	Reilly family
Ashland Daily Press	Ashland	Adams Publishing Group
Augusta Area News	Augusta	Jensen Publishing
Peninsula Pulse.0	Baileys Harbor	Peninsula Publishing Co.
County Ledger Press	Balsam Lake	Tom Miller
Baraboo News Republic	Baraboo	Capital Newspapers/Lee Enterprises
The Bay Viewer	Bayview	USA Today Co.
Beaver Dam Daily Citizen	Beaver Dam	Capital Newspapers/Lee Enterprises
Beloit Daily News	Beloit	Adams Publishing Group
Stateline News	Beloit	Adams Publishing Group
The Berlin Journal	Berlin	The Berlin Journal Company, Inc.
News-Sickle-Arrow	Black Earth	News Publishing Co.
Banner Journal	Black River Falls	News Publishing Co.
The Chronicle	Black River Falls	River Valley Newspaper Group/Lee Enterprises
The Boscobel Dial	Boscobel	Morris Multimedia
The Brillion News	Brodhead	Zander Press Inc.
Brodhead Free Press	Brodhead	Casori Enterprises, LLC
Brookfield News	Brookfield	USA Today Co.
Brown Deer Herald	Brown Deer	USA Today Co.
Burlington Standard Press	Burlington	Southern Lakes Newspapers
The Cadott Sentinel	Cadott	Trygg J. Hansen Publications
The Cashton Record	Cashton	Logan Everson
Chetek Alert	Chetek	Melodee Eckerman
Chilton Times-Journal	Chilton	Calumet Publishing, Inc.
Chippewa Herald	Chippewa Falls	Lee Enterprises
Clintonville Chronicle	Clintonville	Rose Publications
Cochrane-Fountain City Recorder	Cochrane	Valley Publications
The Colfax Messenger	Colfax	Carlton DeWitt
Columbus Journal	Columbus	Capital Newspapers/Lee Enterprises
Cornell/Lake Holcombe Courier	Cornell	Trygg J. Hansen Publications
The Forest Republican	Crandon	Northern Lakes Publishing/Lee Enterprises
Tri-County Press	Cuba City	Morris Multimedia
Cudahy Reminder Enterprise	Cudahy	USA Today Co.
Press Times	De Pere	Multi Media Channels
DeForest Times Tribune	DeForest	Hoard Communications
Walworth County Sunday	Delavan	Adams Publishing Group
The Denmark News	Denmark	Nelson Media Company: Chris C. Nelson
The Dodgeville Chronicle	Dodgeville	Reilly family
Kettle Moraine Index	Dousman	USA Today Co.
The Durand Courier-Wedge	Durand	Valley Publications
East Troy News	East Troy	Southern Lakes Newspapers
The Big Buck Saver	Eau Claire	Independent
Leader-Telegram	Eau Claire	Eau Claire Press Company
The Spectator	Eau Claire	Independent
Volume One	Eau Claire	Independent
The Record Review	Edgar	TP Printing
Edgerton Reporter	Edgerton	Diane Everson
Elkhorn Independent	Elkhorn	Southern Lakes Newspapers
Walworth County Sunday	Elkhorn	Adams Publishing Group
Pierce County Herald	Ellsworth	Rivertown Newspaper Group
Elm Grove News-Independent	Elm Grove	Elm Grove News-Independent, LLC
Elroy Link	Elroy	Independent
The Fennimore Times	Fennimore	Morris Multimedia
Fitchburg Star	Fitchburg	United Newspaper Group/Woodward Communications
The Reporter	Fond du Lac	USA Today Co.
Daily Jefferson County Union	Fort Atkinson	Adams Publishing Group
The Representative	Fox Lake	The Berlin Journal Company, Inc.
Fox Point/Bayside/River Hills Herald	Fox Point	USA Today Co.
Franklin Hub	Franklin	USA Today Co.
Inter-County Leader	Frederic	Inter-County Cooperative Publishing Association
Crawford County Independent	Gays Mills	Morris Multimedia
Germantown Banner Press	Germantown	USA Today Co.
Glendale Herald	Glendale	USA Today Co.
The Tribune Press Reporter	Glenwood City	Carlton DeWitt
Burnett County Sentinel	Grantsburg	Kanabec Publishing
Green Bay Press-Gazette	Green Bay	USA Today Co.
Green Lake County Reporter	Green Lake	The Berlin Journal Company, Inc.
Greendale Village Life	Greendale	Community Newspapers/Journal Communications
Greenfield Observer	Greenfield	USA Today Co.
Hales Corners Village Hub	Hales Corners	USA Today Co.
Lake Country Reporter	Hartland	USA Today Co.
Hillsboro Sentry-Enterprise	Hillsboro	Evans Print Media Group
Holmen Courier	Holmen	River Valley Newspaper Group/Lee Enterprises
Hudson Star-Observer	Hudson	O’Rourke Media Group
Iron County Miner	Hurley	Independent
The Gazette	Janesville	Adams Publishing Group
Janesville Messenger	Janesville	Adams Publishing Group
Times Villager	Kaukauna	News Publishing Co.
Kenosha News	Kenosha	Lee Enterprises
Kewaskum Statesman	Kewaskum	USA Today Co.
The Kewaunee Enterprise	Kewaunee	USA Today Co.
Tri-County News	Kiel	O'Rourke Media Group
La Crosse Tribune	La Crosse	Lee Enterprises
Union Herald	La Crosse	Independent
Lake Geneva Regional News	Lake Geneva	Lee Enterprises
Walworth County Sunday	Lake Geneva	Adams Publishing Group
Leader Independent	Lake Mills	Adams Publishing Group
Grant County Herald Independent	Lancaster	Morris Multimedia
The Lodi Enterprise	Lodi	Hometown News Group
Enterprise Press	Luck	Tom Miller
The Luxemburg News	Luxemburg	Brown County Publishing/Gannett
The Badger Herald	Madison	Independent
The Capital Times	Madison	Capital Newspapers
The Daily Cardinal	Madison	Independent
Isthmus	Madison	Isthmus Publishing Co.
The Madison Misnomer	Madison	Associated Students of Madison
Wisconsin State Journal	Madison	Capital Newspapers/Lee Enterprises
Manitowoc Herald Times Reporter	Manitowoc	USA Today Co.
Marinette-Menominee Eagle Herald	Marinette	Adams Publishing Group
Markesan Regional Reporter	Markesan	The Berlin Journal Company, Inc.
Hub City Times	Marshfield	Multi Media Channels, LLC
Marshfield News-Herald	Marshfield	USA Today Co.
Juneau County Star-Times	Mauston	Capital Newspapers/Lee Enterprises
Star News	Medford	TP Printing
Mellen Weekly Record	Mellen	XL Publishing
Menomonee Falls News	Menomonee Falls	USA Today Co.
The Dunn County News	Menomonie	Chippewa Valley Newspapers/Lee Enterprises
Mequon-Thiensville Courant	Mequon	USA Today Co.
Merrill Foto News	Merrill	USA Today Co.
Middleton Times-Tribune	Middleton	News Publishing Co.
Milton Courier	Milton	Hometown News Group
El Conquistador Latino Newspaper	Milwaukee	Conquistador Communications, LLC
Milwaukee Journal Sentinel	Milwaukee	USA Today Co.
Shepherd Express	Milwaukee	Louis Fortis
Spanish Journal	Milwaukee	Spanish Journal, Inc.
UWM Post	Milwaukee	The UWM Post, Inc.
The Democrat Tribune	Mineral Point	Reilly family
Monroe Times	Monroe	Morris Multimedia
Monroe County Herald	Sparta	Evans Print Media Group
The Marquette County Tribune	Montello	News Publishing Co.
Post Messenger	Monticello	News Publishing Co.
Mount Horeb Mail	Mount Horeb	News Publishing Co.
Mukwonago Chief	Mukwonago	USA Today Co.
Muskego Sun	Muskego	USA Today Co.
The Clark County Press	Neillsville	News Publishing Co.
New Berlin Citizen	New Berlin	USA Today Co.
New Glarus Post Messenger Recorder	New Glarus	News Publishing Co.
New London Press Star	New London	USA Today Co.
Oak Creek Pictorial	Oak Creek	USA Today Co.
Oconomowoc Focus	Oconomowoc	USA Today Co.
Oconto County Reporter	Oconto	USA Today Co.
Omro Herald	Omro	The Berlin Journal Company, Inc.
Onalaska Community Life	Onalaska	River Valley Newspaper Group/Lee Enterprises
The County Line	Ontario	Independent
The Oregon Observer	Oregon	United Newspaper Group/Woodward Communications
Country Messenger	Osceola	Sentinel Publishing, LLC
The Osceola Sun	Osceola	Sentinel Publishing, LLC
Oshkosh Northwestern	Oshkosh	USA Today Co.
Oshkosh Herald	Oshkosh	Oshkosh Herald, LLC
Tri-County News	Osseo	Jensen Publishing
The Platteville Journal	Platteville	Morris Multimedia
Plymouth Review	Plymouth	Barry Johanson
Portage Daily Register	Portage	Capital Newspapers/Lee Enterprises
The Poynette Press	Poynette	Hoard Communications
Courier Press	Prairie du Chien	Howe Printing Co.
Princeton Times-Republic	Princeton	The Berlin Journal Company, Inc.
Journal Times	Racine	Lee Enterprises
Neighbors	Randolph	Capital Newspapers/Lee Enterprises
Reedsburg Independent	Reedsburg	News Publishing Co.
Reedsburg Times-Press	Reedsburg	Capital Newspapers/Lee Enterprises
The North Star Journal	Rhinelander	Journal Community Publishing Group/Journal Communications
Rhinelander Daily News	Rhinelander	Northern Lakes Publishing/Lee Enterprises
The Chronotype	Rice Lake	Chronotype Publishing Company]
The Richland Observer	Richland Center	
Ripon Commonwealth Press	Ripon	O’Rourke Media Group
River Falls Journal	River Falls	Rivertown Newspaper Group
Standard-Press	St. Croix Falls	Tom Miller
St. Francis Reminder-Enterprise	St. Francis	USA Today Co.
Sauk Prairie Eagle	Sauk City	Capital Newspapers/Lee Enterprises
Sauk Prairie Star	Sauk City	News Publishing Co.
Seymour Times-Press	Seymour	USA Today Co.
Shawano Leader	Shawano	Capital Newspapers/Lee Enterprises
Sheboygan Press	Sheboygan	USA Today Co.
The Shell Lake Post	Shell Lake	
Your News In Shiocton	Shiocton	Independent
Shorewood Herald	Shorewood	USA Today Co.
South Milwaukee Voice Graphic	South Milwaukee	USA Today Co.
Stanley Republican	Stanley	Stanley Publishing, LLC
Stevens Point City Times	Stevens Point	Multimedia Channels
Portage County Gazette	Stevens Point	Multimedia Channels
Stevens Point Journal	Stevens Point	USA Today Co.
Stoughton Courier Hub	Stoughton	United Newspaper Group/Woodward Communications
Door County Advocate	Sturgeon Bay	USA Today Co.
Sun Prairie Star	Sun Prairie	Hometown News Group
Superior Telegram	Superior	Murphy McGinnis Media
Sussex Sun	Sussex	USA Today Co.
The Tomah Journal	Tomah	River Valley Newspaper Group/Lee Enterprises
Tomah Monitor Herald	Tomah	River Valley Newspaper Group/Lee Enterprises
Tomahawk Leader	Tomahawk	Independent
The Times	Turtle Lake	Halco Press, LLC
Westosha Report	Twin Lakes	Southern Lakes Newspapers
Westine Report	Union Grove	Southern Lakes Newspapers
Valders Journal	Valders	Valders Journal, Inc.
The Verona Press	Verona	United Newspaper Group/Woodward Communications
Vernon County Broadcaster	Viroqua	River Valley Newspaper Group/Lee Enterprises
The Times	Walworth	Southern Lakes Newspapers
Walworth County Sunday	Walworth	Adams Publishing Group
Waterford Post	Waterford	Southern Lakes Newspapers
Watertown Daily Times	Watertown	Adams Publishing Group
Waukesha Freeman	Waukesha	Conley Publishing Group
The Waunakee Tribune	Waunakee	Drake family
City Pages	Wausau	Tammy Stezenski
Wausau Daily Herald	Wausau	USA Today Co.
Waushara Argus	Wautoma	Mary Kunasch
Wauwatosa News Times	Wauwatosa	USA Today Co.
West Allis Star	West Allis	USA Today Co.
West Bend Daily News	West Bend	Conley Publishing Group
The Coulee News	West Salem	River Valley Newspaper Group/Lee Enterprises
Westby Times	Westby	River Valley Newspaper Group/Lee Enterprises
Whitefish Bay Herald	Whitefish Bay	USA Today Co.
Whitehall Times	Whitehall	Whitehall Times, Inc.
Whitewater Register	Whitewater	Southern Lakes Newspapers
Winneconne News	Winneconne	Rogers Printing Solutions
Wisconsin Dells Events	Wisconsin Dells	Capital Newspapers/Lee Enterprises
Wisconsin Rapids Daily Tribune	Wisconsin Rapids	USA Today Co.
Wisconsin Rapids City Times	Wisconsin Rapids	Multimedia Channels

== Defunct ==
- Green Bay News-Chronicle (1972–2005)
- La Crosse Democrat
- Milwaukee Advertiser
- Milwaukee Free Press (1901–1918)
- Milwaukee Herold
- Milwaukee Journal (1882-1995)
- Milwaukee Sentinel (1837-1995)
- Milwaukee Telegram
- Prescott Patriot (1871-1874)
- Shell Lake Watchman (1910-1928)
- The Paper for Central Wisconsin (Oshkosh)
- Washburn County Register (1928 - 2020)
- Wisconsin News
