= Newspaper endorsements in the 1996 United States presidential election =

During the 1996 United States presidential election, newspapers, magazines, and other publications made general election endorsements.

According to Editor & Publisher, based on responses to their quadrennial poll, Bob Dole received a total of 122 endorsements (total circulation of 7,475,578), and 80 papers supported Bill Clinton, though with a higher total circulation of 8,287,436. Libertarian candidate Harry Browne received one endorsement.

== Domestic newspapers ==
Newspaper	1996 endorsement	Endorsement date	City	State	Type	1992 endorsement	Reference(s)	
Newspaper	1996 endorsement	Endorsement date	City	State	Type	1992 endorsement	1996	1992
Abilene Reporter-News	Bob Dole	October 13	Abilene	Texas	Daily	None		
Agri News	Bob Dole	October 24	Rochester	Minnesota	Weekly	Bill Clinton		
Akron Beacon Journal	Bill Clinton	-	Akron	Ohio	Daily	Bill Clinton		
Albert Lea Tribune	Bill Clinton	November 2	Albert Lea	Minnesota	Daily	None		
Albuquerque Journal	Bob Dole	October 20	Albuquerque	New Mexico	Daily	George H. W. Bush		
The Ann Arbor News	Bill Clinton	November 1	Ann Arbor	Michigan	Daily	Michael Dukakis		
Arizona Daily Star	Bill Clinton	October 27	Tucson	Arizona	Daily	Bill Clinton		
Asbury Park Press	Bill Clinton	October 27	Asbury Park	New Jersey	Daily	Bill Clinton		
The Atlanta Constitution	Bill Clinton	October 23	Atlanta	Georgia	Daily	Bill Clinton		
The Atlanta Journal	Bob Dole	October 25	Atlanta	Georgia	Daily	George H. W. Bush		
Bangor Daily News	Bob Dole	October 28	Bangor	Maine	Daily	George H. W. Bush		
Beaumont Enterprise	Bill Clinton	October 27	Beaumont	Texas	Daily	George H. W. Bush		
Belleville News-Democrat	Bob Dole	November 3	Belleville	Illinois	Daily	George H. W. Bush		
Billings Gazette	Bob Dole	November 1	Billings	Montana	Daily	George H. W. Bush		
Bethany Republican-Clipper	Bob Dole	October 30	Bethany	Missouri	Weekly	George H. W. Bush		
The Boston Globe	Bill Clinton	October 27	Boston	Massachusetts	Daily	Bill Clinton		
Bristol Herald Courier and Bristol Virginia-Tennessean	Bob Dole	October 27	Bristol	Virginia	Daily	George H. W. Bush		
The Buffalo News	Bill Clinton	October 20	Buffalo	New York	Daily	Bill Clinton		
Chanute Tribune	Bob Dole	-	Chanute	Kansas	Twice-weekly	Bill Clinton		
The Charlotte Observer	Bill Clinton	October 27	Charlotte	North Carolina	Daily	Bill Clinton		
Chicago Sun-Times	Bill Clinton	October 20	Chicago	Illinois	Daily	Bill Clinton		
Chicago Tribune	Bob Dole	October 20	Chicago	Illinois	Daily	George H. W. Bush		
The Cincinnati Enquirer	Bob Dole	October 27	Cincinnati	Ohio	Daily	George H. W. Bush		
The Cincinnati Post (Note: The E.W. Scripps Company has endorsed the candidate on behalf of the paper.)	Bob Dole	October 19	Cincinnati	Ohio	Daily	George H. W. Bush		
The Citizens' Voice	Bill Clinton	October 27	Wilkes-Barre	Pennsylvania	Daily	Bill Clinton		
The Clarion-Ledger	Bill Clinton	October 27	Jackson	Mississippi	Daily	George H. W. Bush		
The Columbus Dispatch	Bob Dole	October 25	Columbus	Ohio	Daily	George H. W. Bush		
The Commercial Appeal	Bob Dole	October 20	Memphis	Tennessee	Daily	George H. W. Bush		
Concord Monitor	Bill Clinton	October 20	Concord	New Hampshire	Daily	Bill Clinton		
Connecticut Post	Bob Dole	October 25	Bridgeport	Connecticut	Daily	Ross Perot		
Corpus Christi Caller-Times	Bob Dole	October 20	Corpus Christi	Texas	Daily	George H. W. Bush		
The Courier-Journal	Bill Clinton	October 20	Louisville	Kentucky	Daily	Bill Clinton		
Courier-News	Bill Clinton	October 27	Bridgewater	New Jersey	Daily	Bill Clinton		
The Daily News	Bob Dole	October 27	Bowling Green	Kentucky	Daily	George H. W. Bush		
Daily News	Bill Clinton	October 20	New York City	New York	Daily	Bill Clinton (Note: New York Daily News's endorsement of Bill Clinton was their first Democratic endorsement since Franklin Roosevelt in 1940.)		
Daily Press	Bob Dole	October 27	Newport News	Virginia	Daily	George H. W. Bush		
Daily Register	Bob Dole	October 27	Portage	Wisconsin	Daily	Unknown		
Daily Tribune	Bob Dole	November 1	Wisconsin Rapids	Wisconsin	Daily	George H. W. Bush		
The Dallas Morning News	Bob Dole	October 20	Dallas	Texas	Daily	George H. W. Bush		
The Day	Bob Dole	October 27	New London	Connecticut	Daily	Bill Clinton		
Dayton Daily News	Bill Clinton	November 3	Dayton	Ohio	Daily	Michael Dukakis		
Delaware County Daily Times	Bob Dole	-	Upper Darby	Pennsylvania	Daily	Bill Clinton		
The Denver Post	Bill Clinton	October 27	Denver	Colorado	Daily	Bill Clinton		
The Des Moines Register	Bill Clinton	October 27	Des Moines	Iowa	Daily	Bill Clinton		
Detroit Free Press	Bill Clinton	October 8	Detroit	Michigan	Daily	Bill Clinton		
El Paso Herald-Post	Bob Dole	October 21	El Paso	Texas	Daily	George H. W. Bush		
The Evansville Courier	Bob Dole	October 20	Evansville	Indiana	Daily	George H. W. Bush		
The Evansville Press	Bob Dole	November 1	Evansville	Indiana	Daily	George H. W. Bush		
The Florida Times-Union	Bob Dole	November 3	Jacksonville	Florida	Daily	George H. W. Bush		
Florida Today	Bill Clinton	October 20	Melbourne	Florida	Daily	Bill Clinton		
Fort Worth Star-Telegram	Bob Dole	October 13	Fort Worth	Texas	Daily	George H. W. Bush		
The Forum	Bob Dole	November 1	Fargo	North Dakota	Daily	George H. W. Bush		
The Gazette	Bob Dole	November 3	Cedar Rapids	Iowa	Daily	Ross Perot		
Grand Forks Herald	None	October 27	Grand Forks	North Dakota	Daily	Bill Clinton		
The Grand Rapids Press	Bob Dole	November 1	Grand Rapids	Michigan	Daily	Bill Clinton		
Great Falls Tribune	Split (Note: The Great Falls Tribune's editorial board faced a split vote and endorsed both Bill Clinton and Bob Dole.)	October 27	Great Falls	Montana	Daily	None		
The Greenville News	Bob Dole	October 20	Greenville	South Carolina	Daily	George H. W. Bush		
The Greenwood Commonwealth	Bob Dole	November 3	Greenwood	Mississippi	Daily	Bill Clinton		
The Hartford Courant	Bill Clinton	October 27	Hartford	Connecticut	Daily	Bill Clinton		
The Herald	Bill Clinton	October 27	Everett	Washington	Daily	Bill Clinton		
High Point Enterprise	Bob Dole	October 27	High Point	North Carolina	Daily	George H. W. Bush		
The Honolulu Advertiser	Bill Clinton	October 27	Honolulu	Hawaii	Daily	None		
Honolulu Star-Bulletin	Bill Clinton	October 31	Honolulu	Hawaii	Daily	Bill Clinton		
Houston Chronicle	Bob Dole	October 27	Houston	Texas	Daily	George H. W. Bush		
The Hutchinson News	Bob Dole	-	Hutchinson	Kansas	Daily	Unknown		
The Idaho Statesman	Bob Dole	October 27	Boise	Idaho	Daily	George H. W. Bush		
The Indianapolis Star	Bob Dole	October 20	Indianapolis	Indiana	Daily	George H. W. Bush		
The Jersey Journal	Bill Clinton	November 2	Jersey City	New Jersey	Daily	Bill Clinton		
The Jonesboro Sun	Bill Clinton	November 3	Jonesboro	Arkansas	Daily	Bill Clinton		
Journal and Courier	Bob Dole	October 23	Lafayette	Indiana	Daily	George H. W. Bush		
Journal Star (Note: Copley Press has endorsed the candidate on behalf of the paper.)	Bob Dole	October 27	Peoria	Illinois	Daily	Bill Clinton		
The Kansas City Star	Bob Dole	October 27	Kansas City	Missouri	Daily	Bill Clinton		
The Knoxville News-Sentinel	Bob Dole	October 20	Knoxville	Tennessee	Daily	George H. W. Bush		
La Crosse Tribune	None	November 3	La Crosse	Wisconsin	Daily	George H. W. Bush		
The Leader	Bill Clinton	October 27	Corning	New York	Daily	Bill Clinton		
The Miami Herald	None	November 1	Miami	Florida	Daily	None		
Midland Daily News	Bob Dole	October 27	Midland	Michigan	Daily	George H. W. Bush		
The Mississippi Press	Bob Dole	November 3	Pascagoula	Mississippi	Daily	George H. W. Bush		
Milwaukee Journal Sentinel	Bob Dole	-	Milwaukee	Wisconsin	Daily	Split (Note: The Milwaukee Journal made endorsement for both Bill Clinton and George H. W. Bush. The endorsement from the Milwaukee Sentinel is unknown.)		
Morning Star and Wilmington News	Bob Dole	October 31	Wilmington	North Carolina	Daily	Bill Clinton		
The Muskegon Chronicle	Bill Clinton	October 27	Muskegon	Michigan	Daily	Bill Clinton		
Naples Daily News	Bob Dole	October 21	Naples	Florida	Daily	George H. W. Bush		
New Haven Register	Bob Dole	October 20	New Haven	Connecticut	Daily	George H. W. Bush		
The New York Observer	Bob Dole	October 7	New York City	New York	Weekly	Unknown		
New York Post	Bob Dole	October 20 - November 5	New York City	New York	Daily	George H. W. Bush		
The New York Times	Bill Clinton	October 27	New York City	New York	Daily	Bill Clinton		
The News-Journal	Bill Clinton	October 27	Daytona Beach	Florida	Daily	Michael Dukakis		
News-Press	None	November 3	Fort Myers	Florida	Daily	George H. W. Bush		
News & Record	Bill Clinton	October 27	Greensboro	North Carolina	Daily	Bill Clinton		
Newsday	Bill Clinton	October 27	Melville	New York	Daily	Bill Clinton		
The Newton Kansan	Bob Dole	-	Newton	Kansas	Daily	Bill Clinton		
Northwest Herald	Bob Dole	October 29	Crystal Lake	Illinois	Daily	George H. W. Bush		
Norwich Bulletin	Bob Dole	October 27	Norwich	Connecticut	Daily	Bill Clinton		
The Olympian	Bill Clinton	November 1	Olympia	Washington	Daily	Bill Clinton		
The Oregonian	Bill Clinton	October 27	Portland	Oregon	Daily	Bill Clinton		
Oshkosh Northwestern	Bob Dole	October 20	Oshkosh	Wisconsin	Daily	George H. W. Bush		
The Palm Beach Post	Bill Clinton	October 25	West Palm Beach	Florida	Daily	Bill Clinton		
The Pantagraph	Bob Dole	October 20	Bloomington	Indiana	Daily	George H. W. Bush		
The Patriot and Evening News	Bob Dole	October 27	Harrisburg	Pennsylvania	Daily	Bill Clinton		
Philadelphia Daily News	Bill Clinton	November 4	Philadelphia	Pennsylvania	Daily	Bill Clinton		
The Philadelphia Inquirer	Bill Clinton	October 27	Philadelphia	Pennsylvania	Daily	Bill Clinton		
Pittsburgh Post-Gazette	Bill Clinton	November 1	Pittsburgh	Pennsylvania	Daily	Bill Clinton		
The Plain Dealer	Bill Clinton	October 27	Cleveland	Ohio	Daily	Bill Clinton		
Portland Press Herald	Bill Clinton	October 27	Portland	Maine	Daily	George H. W. Bush		
The Press of Atlantic City	None	November 3	Atlantic City	New Jersey	Daily	Bill Clinton		
The Record	Bill Clinton	November 3	Hackensack	New Jersey	Daily	Bill Clinton		
Record-Journal	Bill Clinton	November 3	Meriden	Connecticut	Daily	Bill Clinton		
The Recorder	Bill Clinton	October 31	Greenfield	Massachusetts	Daily	Bill Clinton		
The Register-Guard	Bill Clinton	October 27	Eugene	Oregon	Daily	Bill Clinton		
Richmond Times-Dispatch	Bob Dole	October 20	Richmond	Virginia	Daily	George H. W. Bush		
The Roanoke Times	Bill Clinton	October 27	Roanoke	Virginia	Daily	Bill Clinton		
Rockford Register Star	Bob Dole	October 30	Rockford	Illinois	Daily	Bill Clinton		
Rocky Mountain News	Bob Dole	October 20	Denver	Colorado	Daily	George H. W. Bush		
The Sacramento Bee	Bill Clinton	October 20	Sacramento	California	Daily	Bill Clinton		
The Saginaw News	Bob Dole	November 3	Saginaw	Michigan	Daily	George H. W. Bush		
San Antonio Express-News	Bob Dole	October 16	San Antonio	Texas	Daily	George H. W. Bush		
San Jose Mercury News	Bill Clinton	-	San Diego	California	Daily	Bill Clinton		
San Francisco Chronicle	Bill Clinton	October 28	San Francisco	California	Daily	George H. W. Bush		
San Francisco Examiner	Bill Clinton	October 27	San Francisco	California	Daily	Bill Clinton		
The Times	Bill Clinton	October 27	Trenton	New Jersey	Daily	Bill Clinton		
The Santa Fe New Mexican	Bill Clinton	October 27	Santa Fe	New Mexico	Daily	Bill Clinton		
Santa Barbara News-Press	Bill Clinton	October 27	Santa Barbara	California	Daily	Bill Clinton		
Seattle Post-Intelligencer	Bill Clinton	October 20	Seattle	Washington	Daily	Bill Clinton		
The Seattle Times	Bill Clinton	October 27	Seattle	Washington	Daily	Bill Clinton		
Shreveport Journal (Note: Although the Shreveport Journal ceased publication in 1991, they matained an editorial page in The Times via agreement until December 31, 1999.)	Bill Clinton	October 18	Shreveport	Louisiana	Daily	Bill Clinton		
South Bend Tribune	Bill Clinton	November 1	South Bend	Indiana	Daily	Bill Clinton		
Southern Illinoisan	Bob Dole	November 3	Carbondale	Illinois	Daily	George H. W. Bush		
The Spokesman-Review	Bob Dole	October 13	Spokane	Washington	Daily	Bill Clinton		
Springfield Union-News	Bill Clinton	October 21	Springfield	Massachusetts	Daily	Bill Clinton		
St. Cloud Times	Bill Clinton	October 31	St. Cloud	Minnesota	Daily	Bill Clinton		
St. Louis Post-Dispatch	Bill Clinton	October 20	St. Louis	Missouri	Daily	Bill Clinton		
Saint Paul Pioneer Press	Bill Clinton	October 19	Saint Paul	Minnesota	Daily	Bill Clinton		
The Star-Ledger	Bill Clinton	October 20	Newark	New Jersey	Daily	Bill Clinton		
Star Tribune	Bill Clinton	October 20	Minneapolis	Minnesota	Daily	Bill Clinton		
The State	Bob Dole	November 3	Columbia	South Carolina	Daily	George H. W. Bush		
The State Journal-Register	Bob Dole	October 27	Springfield	Illinois	Daily	George H. W. Bush		
Staten Island Advance	Bill Clinton	November 3	Staten Island	New York	Daily	Bill Clinton		
Statesman Journal	Bill Clinton	October 19	Salem	Oregon	Daily	Bill Clinton		
The Sun	Bob Dole	October 23	Bremerton	Washington	Daily	George H. W. Bush		
Sun-Sentinel	Bill Clinton	October 27	Fort Lauderdale	Florida	Daily	George H. W. Bush		
Telegram & Gazette	Bob Dole	November 1	Worcester	Massachusetts	Daily	George H. W. Bush		
The Tennessean	Bill Clinton	October 20	Nashville	Tennessee	Daily	Bill Clinton		
The Times	Bill Clinton	October 27	Shreveport	Louisiana	Daily	Bill Clinton		
The Times	Bill Clinton	October 27	Trenton	New Jersey	Daily	Bill Clinton		
TimesDaily	Bob Dole	November 3	Florence	Alabama	Daily	Bill Clinton		
The Times Leader	Bill Clinton	October 30	Wilkes-Barre	Pennsylvania	Daily	Bill Clinton		
The Truth	Bob Dole	October 27	Elkhart	Indiana	Daily	George H. W. Bush		
Tulsa World	Bob Dole	October 20	Tulsa	Oklahoma	Daily	George H. W. Bush		
The Washington Times	Bob Dole	-	Washington D.C.		Daily	George H. W. Bush		
West Central Tribune	Bob Dole	October 29	Willmar	Minnesota	Daily	George H. W. Bush		
The Wichita Eagle	Bob Dole	October 20	Wichita	Kansas	Daily	Bill Clinton		
Winston-Salem Journal	Bob Dole	October 20	Winston-Salem	North Carolina	Daily	George H. W. Bush		

== Foreign newspapers ==
Newspaper	1996 endorsement	Endorsement date	City	Country	Type	1992 endorsement	Reference(s)	
Newspaper	1996 endorsement	Endorsement date	City	Country	Type	1992 endorsement	1996	1992
The Economist	Bob Dole	-	London	United Kingdom	Weekly	Bill Clinton		
