= William T. Evjue =

American newspaper editor and radio executive

William T. Evjue (October 10, 1882 – April 23, 1970; born Peder Wilhelm Theodor Evjue) was an American newspaper editor and radio broadcast executive. He founded The Capital Times and also helped launch the radio station WIBA (AM), both in Madison, Wisconsin. He also served as a Wisconsin state legislator.

== Biography ==
Peder Evjue was born to Norwegian emigrant parents in Merrill, Wisconsin. His name was later modified to William T. Evjue. Evjue first worked for the Citizens Bank of Merrill. He then went to University of Wisconsin in Madison, Wisconsin. After graduating in 1905, Evjue became a reporter at the Milwaukee Sentinel and later worked for the Wisconsin State Journal as the business manager. In 1917, Evjue served in the Wisconsin State Assembly as a Republican. He served as director of the Republican State Central Committee of Wisconsin from 1920 to 1924.

The Wisconsin State Journal had opposed the anti-war views of United States Senator Robert M. La Follette, Sr. In 1917, Evjue left the Wisconsin State Journal. He started The Capital Times and continued to support La Follette Sr. and the Wisconsin Progressive Party. Later Evjue and The Capital Times supported Democratic candidates. In 1925, he started the radio station, WIBA, and continued to serve as station president until his death. In 1934, he was appointed chairman of the Wisconsin Progressive Party. Evjue died at his home in Madison, Wisconsin and was buried in Forest Hill Cemetery in Dane County, Wisconsin. Before his death, he established the Evjue Foundation and stipulated in his will that profits go to the foundation to be distributed to worthy causes in the community.
