= Joseph J. Stoner House =

Historic house in Wisconsin, United States

- U.S. National Register of Historic Places
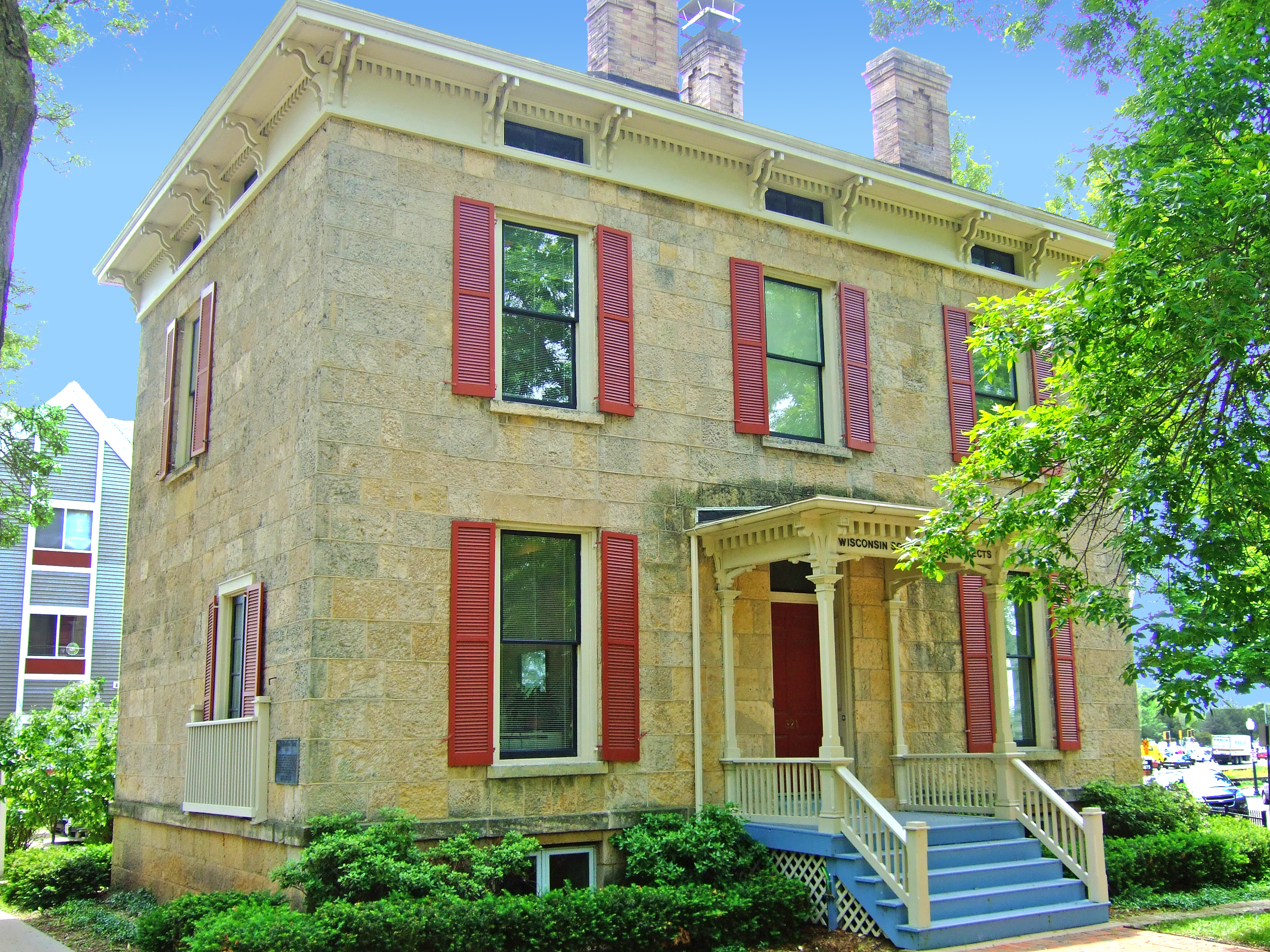

- Location within Wisconsin Location within the United States
- Location: 321 S. Hamilton St. Madison, Wisconsin
- Coordinates: 43°4′12″N 89°23′2″W
- Area: 0.258 acres (0.104 ha)
- Built: c. 1855
- Architectural style: Italianate
- NRHP reference No.: 80000129
- Added to NRHP: January 17, 1980

The Joseph J. Stoner House is a historic Italiante-style house built in 1855 four blocks south of the capitol in Madison, Wisconsin, United States. It was the home of Stoner, the central figure in the birds-eye-view map business of the late 1800s. In 1980 the house was added to the National Register of Historic Places, judged significant for its association with Stoner and as a good example of a detached Italianate townhouse.

== History ==
The Stoner house had its start in 1854 when land agents Henry Wright and Charles Meyer bought a lot where Hamilton Street stops at Lake Monona. This was before the Chicago and North Western Railway built the filled right-of-way between the lot and the lake, and before more fill was added for John Nolen Drive, so the lot was lakeshore property at the time. The house was built 100 feet to the south of its current location, with Lake Monona lapping at the back yard.

The front of the house is little changed since then - two stories with windows symmetric around a centered door, with a hip and deck roof, styled Italianate. Hallmarks of that style present in this house are the double brackets under the eaves, the shallow hip roof, and the ornate front porch. Eyebrow windows peek out between the eaves brackets, in line with the windows below. The simple window and door trim are typical of Greek Revival style - not Italianate. The house is clad in local sandstone laid so that small blocks alternate with large, a pattern common in 1800s southern Wisconsin. Three corbelled chimneys rise from the roof. For many years the back of the house sported a two-story porch decorated with scroll saw-work facing the lake.

The house was sold to Mrs. Henry Staines in 1856 for $3,607. Henry and Janet Staines were Scottish immigrants who had bought the Sauk City Flour Mill and invested in land in Sauk County. By 1854 they owned a lot in Madison, and in 1856 they moved with their eight children to the Stoner house. They probably lost the house in the Panic of 1857 and Henry ended up as a merchant in Prairie du Sac.

Robert and Christina Nichols bought the house in 1863 for $600. Robert was a butcher with a shop a short walk away at the corner of South Hamilton and Carroll.

Joseph John Stoner bought the house in 1865 for $3,000. This Pennsylvanian had arrived in Madison in 1864, a book salesman. There he married his boss's daughter Harriet Daggett. They settled in the house on Hamilton Street. During their time, the house's kitchen was in the basement, the first floor held a living room and library, the second floor held bedrooms, and servants quarters were tucked above.

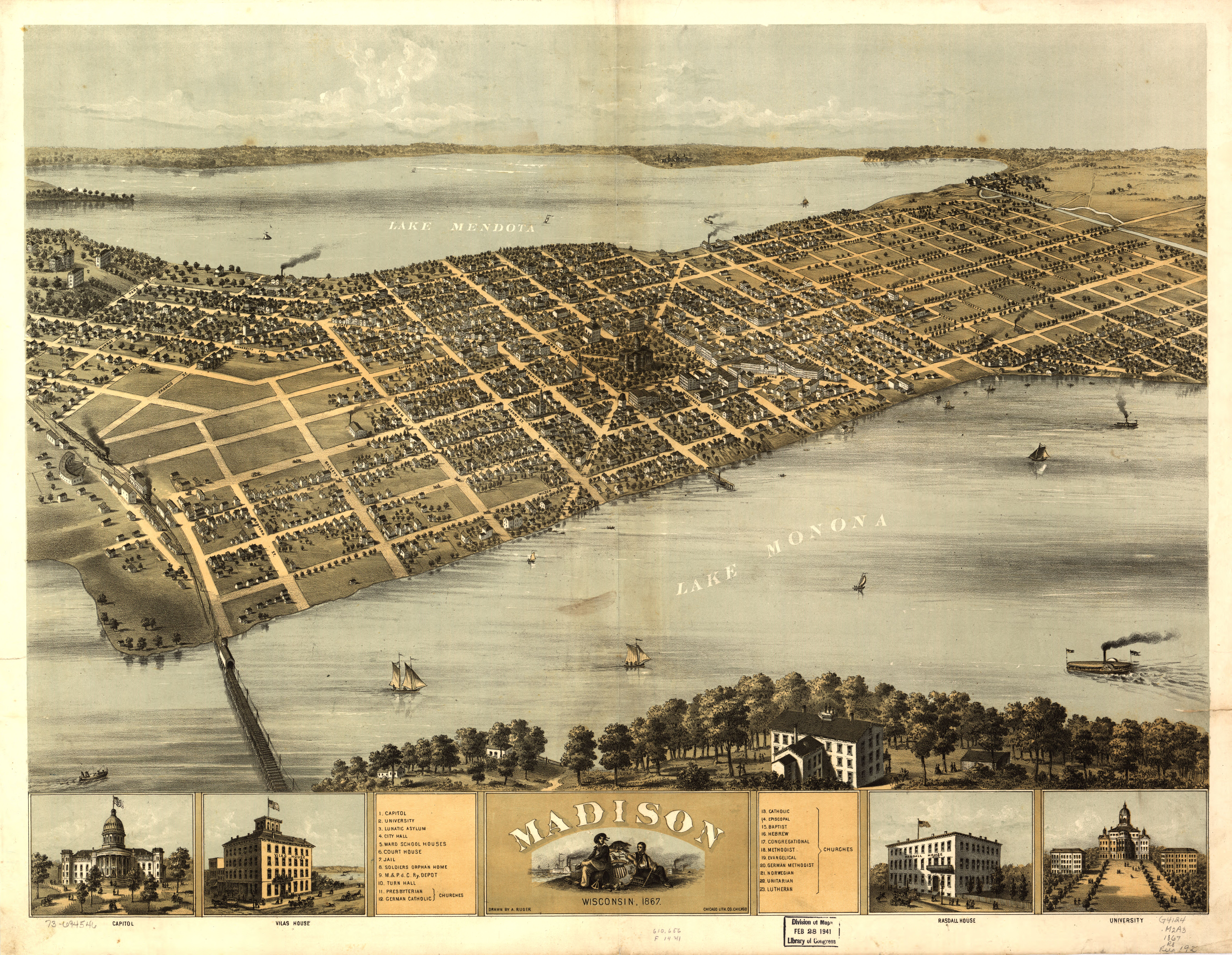
Ruger's 1867 birds-eye view map of Madison. Stoner's house is included, where South Hamilton stops at Lake Monona.

Albert Ruger visited Madison in 1867 to sketch a bird's-eye view of the city. Before aerial photography, this was a way to give people a different, flattering view of their growing cities. Two years later, Stoner went into the birds-eye map business with Ruger. The artist would visit a city and make a sketch. The sketch might feature prominent businesses and institutions, to draw interest and encourage those with money to reserve a copy. They would try to get the newspaper to endorse the project. When there were enough orders, the artist would complete a finished map and get it printed. After the map was finished and returned from the lithographer, Stoner or an agent would return to the town to deliver the maps and sell additional copies. Ruger and Stoner produced maps for twelve Midwestern cities, then continued working their way through Ohio, Tennessee and West Virginia. Around the same time, two other map producers started similar businesses in Madison - Mortimer Fowler and Howard Heston Bailey. In 1872 Stoner parted with Ruger and began working with two other artists. In 1879 he began working with others, producing 105 views from across the country. Throughout, Stoner conducted this business out of his house on Hamilton Street, retiring in 1884.

In 1886 Thomas and Susan Regan bought the house. Thomas was an Irish immigrant who had lived in Madison for thirty years. He owned a plumbing business at 118 S. Pinckney Street, dealt real estate, and worked as a master plumber in the Capitol. Thomas died in 1915, but his daughters stayed in the house. They moved the kitchen from the basement to the first floor, and in the basement added a laundry room and rec room.

Varley and Ellen Bond bought the house in 1922. Varley had been a manager at the F.W. Woolworth store and was a stockholder and eventually vice-president of Manchester's, the leading department store at that time. The Varleys remodeled the house from 1923 to 1926, preserving the old look. A 1947 newspaper article gushed:

The present dining room is furnished with massive mahogany table, chairs, and sideboard, and overlooks the lake. The whole west side of the main floor is occupied by a spacious living room, with windows facing both the street and the lake. The upper floor is given over to guest rooms and a five-room attic tops the whole...The rooms are airy - ten and one-half feet from floor to ceiling. The sturdy construction of the house is evidenced in that not a crack mars the plaster walls and ceilings that have stood nearly a century.

In 1957 architects Carl Gausewitz and Robert Cashin bought the house from the Bonds, and it housed several architectural firms for five years, then sat vacant for five more. David Tennesen bought it in 1967, removed the back porch, and rented the space to law firms and the Wisconsin Civil Liberties Union.

Madison Newspapers bought the house in 1970, along with the rest of the block. It considered options including turning the site into a parking lot. Concerned preservationists got the site named a city landmark. Madison Newspapers' plans never gelled and it tried to sell the house for $250,000, but no-one bit. In 1980 the house was named to the National Register of Historic Places, significant for its association with Madison's birds-eye-map-man, and as a good example of a detached Italianate townhouse clad in local sandstone.

In 1983, the house was gifted to the Wisconsin Architects Foundation by Madison Newspapers. The foundation went on to move the house to a different location 100 feet away and extensively renovate it at a cost of more than $200,000. With those renovations, the Stoner house houses offices of the Wisconsin Society of Architects and a small museum.
