= Anne Nicol Gaylor =

American atheist and campaigner for abortion rights

- Anne Gaylor: "A Second Look At Religion"
- Born: Lucie Anne Nicol; November 25, 1926; Tomah, Wisconsin, U.S.
- Died: June 14, 2015 (aged 88); Fitchburg, Wisconsin, U.S.
- Education: University of Wisconsin–Madison
- Occupations: Activist; founder of the Freedom From Religion Foundation

Anne Nicol Gaylor (November 25, 1926 – June 14, 2015) was an American atheist and reproductive rights advocate. She co-founded the Freedom from Religion Foundation and an abortion fund for Wisconsin women. She wrote the book Abortion Is a Blessing and edited The World Famous Atheist Cookbook. In 1985 Gaylor received the Humanist Heroine Award from the American Humanist Association, and in 2007 she was given the Tiller Award by NARAL Pro-Choice America.

== Biography ==
Anne Nicol was born to Jason Theodore and Lucy Edna (née Sowle) Nicol on November 25, 1926, in Tomah, Wisconsin. Her mother died when Anne was two years old. Anne Nicol graduated from high school at age 16 and earned an English degree from the University of Wisconsin–Madison in May, 1949. She married Paul Joseph Gaylor later that year, and they had four children: Andy, Annie Laurie, Ian, and Jamie. Her father attended a Church of Christ in his youth but grew to have disdain for religion.

Gaylor started the first private employment agency in Madison, Wisconsin, which she sold in 1966. She then became editor of the Middleton Times-Tribune.

== Abortion advocacy ==
In 1967, while editor of the Times-Tribune, Gaylor wrote an editorial calling for legalized abortion in Wisconsin. She later joined the Association for the Study of Abortion, the Wisconsin Committee to Legalize Abortion, and Zero Population Growth. In 1970 first-trimester abortions were legalized in Wisconsin, and she began the Zero Population Growth Referral Service to refer women to abortion providers. However, there were still few doctors who provided abortions in the state, so Gaylor often referred women to Mexico and New York. She also served on the Board of Directors of NARAL, now known as NARAL Pro-Choice America.

Along with University of Wisconsin professor Robert West, Gaylor founded the Women's Medical Fund to expand the services provided by the ZPG Referral Service. The organization was incorporated as a nonprofit in 1976. It provides small grants (on average about $200) to women who are unable to pay the full costs of their abortions.

Funding comes from individual donors and foundation grants. In the past the Fund advertised its services, but now referrals come directly from abortion clinics. The organization is run entirely by volunteers, with no paid staff, and Gaylor answers many of the referral calls herself. It has paid out nearly $3,000,000 to abortion providers on behalf of patients. In 2009 the organization paid out $162,202 to its clients, and Gaylor took about 800 phone calls. By 2010, Gaylor had written checks to help pay for 18,986 abortions.

In 1975, Gaylor wrote Abortion Is a Blessing, in which she argues for liberalization of abortion laws and details her experiences advocating for reproductive rights. The book is currently out of print, but the full text is available online.

== Freedom from Religion Foundation ==
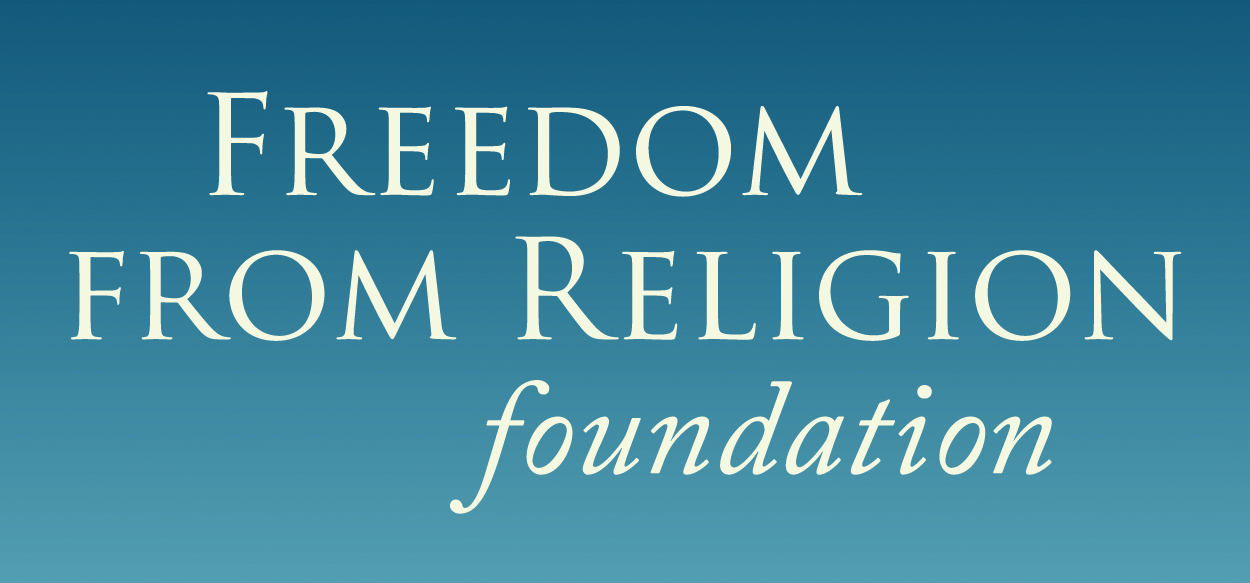
Freedom From Religion Foundation logo

While working on abortion rights issues, Gaylor felt the need to address what she saw as the root cause of women's oppression: religion. She felt that the existing women's rights organizations were not confronting this issue, so she founded the Freedom from Religion Foundation (FFRF) in 1976, along with her daughter Annie Laurie and John Sontarck. She served as the president and executive director until her retirement in 2005. The group is currently headed by her daughter and son-in-law, Dan Barker. She worked as a consultant for the FFRF and held the position of president emerita. While she was president the group grew from three to over 19,000 members in all 50 U.S. states and Canada.

FFRF is a nonprofit organization that promotes the separation of church and state and educates the public on matters relating to atheism, agnosticism, and nontheism. Under her leadership, the foundation was involved in several high-profile legal cases, including one that ended the teaching of Christian doctrine in a Tennessee public school and another that overturned a law that made Good Friday a state holiday in Wisconsin.

Gaylor produced the first atheist commercials that ever aired on television, on Madison's Channel 3. She also appeared on television and radio programs such as Crossfire, Larry King's radio show, and Oprah Winfrey's A.M. Chicago as a spokesperson for FFRF. In 1999, the FFRF published The World Famous Atheist Cookbook, edited by Gaylor.

== Death ==
Gaylor's husband died of brain cancer in 2011, and she moved into a retirement home outside of Madison, Wisconsin, in 2012.

On May 30, 2015, a serious fall at her home fractured her skull, and she was later hospitalized. She died in a hospice on June 14, 2015.

== Awards ==
- Commendation from the Wisconsin State Assembly
- Citation from the Wisconsin State Senate
- Wisconsin National Organization for Women Feminist of the Year Award
- Service and Commitment Award from the Wisconsin Chapter of the National Women's Political Caucus
- Humanist Heroine Award from the American Humanist Association
- NARAL's Tiller Award
