= Edgerton Reporter =

Weekly newspaper in Edgerton, Wisconsin

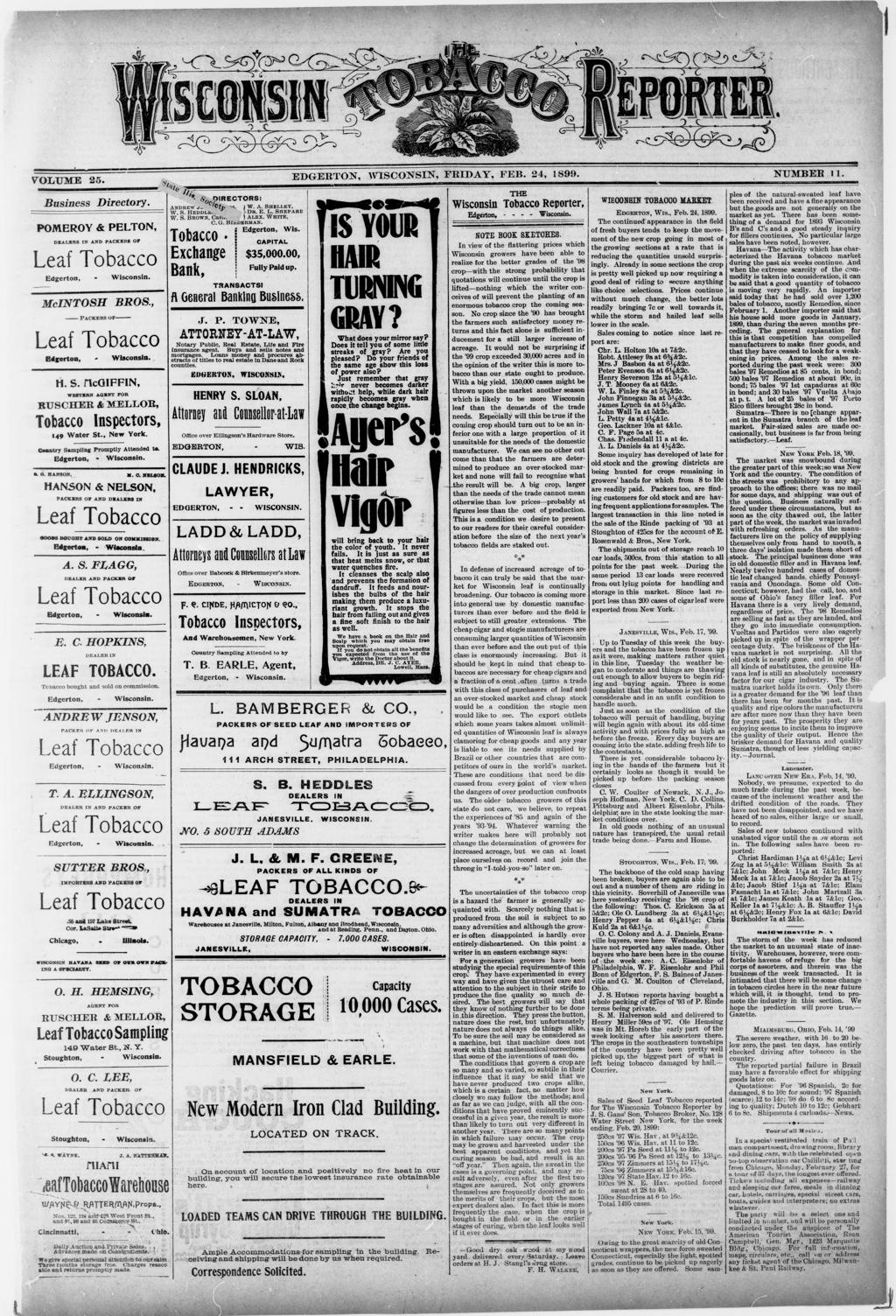
- The February 24, 1899, front page of the Wisconsin Tobacco Reporter
- Type: Weekly newspaper
- Format: Broadsheet
- Publisher: Frederic William Coon (historically); Diane Everson (current)
- Editor: William Tousley (1877-1882); Frederic Coon (1882-1919); Dilly Ristad (1919-1931); Christian Hoen (1931 to 1949); George Bozich, (1949-1951)
- Founded: 1874
- Language: English
- Headquarters: 21 North Henry Street; Edgerton, Wisconsin 53534
- City: Edgerton, Wisconsin
- Country: United States
- ISSN: 2768-5284
- OCLC number: 14581198
- Website: http://www.edgertonreporter.com/

The Edgerton Reporter, formerly the Edgerton Independent, the Weekly Tobacco Reporter, and the Wisconsin Tobacco Reporter, is an American weekly newspaper based in Edgerton, Wisconsin.

== History ==
The Edgerton Reporter traces its origins to 1874 when it was founded as the Edgerton Independent. The Edgerton Independent lasted from 1874-1877 when it was eventually merged in 1925 with the Edgerton Eagle newspaper. Due to community of Edgerton's tie to the tobacco industry of southern Wisconsin and being known regionally as the "Tobacco capital of the Midwest" and locally as "tobacco city" the city's newspaper was rebranded as the Wisconsin Tobacco Reporter.

Early on the newspaper covered the tobacco business in the surrounding area of Edgerton and northern Rock County, as well adjacent southern Dane County. The newspaper also covered regional, state, and national news. According to William Fiske Brown's book Rock County Wisconsin: a New History of its Cities, Villages, Towns, and Citizens and Varied Interests, from the Earliest Times, Up to Date from 1908 the newspaper covered news "all over the United States and across the ocean and is a recognized authority on the tobacco market".

The newspaper began under the leadership of William Tousley before being published and edited by Frederick "Fred" William Coon (1850-1919) of the nearby city of Milton, Wisconsin. Coon was a local Republican advocate and heavily involved in the eastern markets within the larger American tobacco industry. According to Fiske, "His position as a prominent editor has brought him in contact with many of the leading men of the state, and he has frequently been called to fill positions of trust and responsibility. He was for ten years secretary of the State Press Association, and has served as assistant clerk of the house in state legislature for eight terms, and for two terms held the same position in the state senate". Coon also wrote an extensive guide to the growth and upkeep of tobacco crops in his 1885 book The Tobacco Growers' Guide: A Compilation of Hints, Suggestions and Experience of the Most Practical and Successful Tobacco Growers.

From 1950 onwards the newspaper was renamed The Edgerton Reporter in order to attract national advertising and broaden its readership with other nearby communities, such as Janesville, Wisconsin. In 2024 The Edgerton Reporter celebrated its 150th anniversary. The newspaper office is headquartered at 21 North Henry Street in Edgerton. Copies of the Edgerton Tobacco Reporter are freely available through the Edgerton Public Library and through the Library of Congress.

== See also ==
- List of newspapers in Wisconsin
