= Dodgeville Chronicle =

Newspaper published in Wisconsin

- Type: Weekly newspaper
- Owner(s): The Dodgeville Chronicle, Inc.
- Publisher: Mike and Pat Reilly
- Editor: J. Patrick Reilly
- Founded: 1862
- Headquarters: 106 W. Merrimac St., Dodgeville, WI 53533
- Circulation: 3,245 (as of 2022)
- Website: thedodgevillechronicle.com

The Dodgeville Chronicle is a weekly newspaper published on Thursday in Dodgeville, Wisconsin. It is read throughout Iowa County, Wisconsin and surrounding counties. The chronicle also publishes a small newspaper, the Democrat-Tribune, for Mineral Point.

== History ==
The first edition of the newspapers was published on Thursday, September 18, 1862.

In 1911, Russell Kessler started working at the paper as a printers "devil" for a weekly wage of $7. Kessler purchased the paper and became sole owner in 1936. He married Lillian Holt in 1939, who became the paper's owner following his death in 1943.

In the late 1960's, Lillian's nephews Mike and Pat Reilly started work at the paper. Lillian died in 1984, and Pat and Mike are co-publishers of the paper as of 2023.

== See also ==
- List of newspapers in Wisconsin
