= Wisconsin Rapids Daily Tribune =

Newspaper in Wisconsin Rapids, Wisconsin

- Type: Daily newspaper
- Format: Broadsheet
- Owner: USA Today Co.
- Founder(s): William F. Huffman, Sr.
- Publisher: Andy Fisher
- Editor: Jamie Rokus
- Founded: early 1900s
- Headquarters: United States
- Circulation: 2,600 (as of 2022)
- Website: wisconsinrapidstribune.com

The Wisconsin Rapids Daily Tribune is a daily newspaper published in Wisconsin Rapids, Wisconsin. It is owned by USA Today Co., which also owns the nearby Stevens Point Journal and Marshfield News-Herald. The newspaper was formerly owned by Thomson Newspapers Inc.

== History ==
The newspaper was started in the early 1900s by William F. Huffman, Sr.

In the 1990s, the paper was at the center of a controversial murder case, when the Daily Tribune's receptionist, Jayne Susan Jacobson, murdered publisher David Gentry's secretary, Julie Schroer at Schroer's home in 1990. Jacobson was found not guilty by reason of mental disease or defect and was released within a few years of the slaying.

Among former staffers of this newspaper are Robert D. McFadden, a Pulitzer Prize-winning senior reporter for The New York Times, who worked for the Daily Tribune from 1957 to 1958; Robert Des Jarlais, an award-winning sports and general news editor and reporter at the Daily Tribune from the mid-1960s until shortly before his death in 2003; and David L. Van Wormer, an Outdoor Writer for the Milwaukee Journal, a sportswriter and editor for the Tribune at various times between 1970 and 1995.
