= Pierce County Herald =

The Pierce County Herald may refer to either of two newspapers:

- The Puyallup Herald, a newspaper in Pierce County, Washington that formerly had this title
- a newspaper in Pierce County, Wisconsin, merged with the Red Wing Republican Eagle in 2019
