= The Capital Times =

Newspaper published in Madison, Wisconsin, US

- Front page, February 14, 2024.
- Type: Weekly newspaper
- Owner: Evjue Foundation
- Founder: William T. Evjue
- Publisher: Paul Fanlund
- Editor: Mark Treinen
- Staff writers: Dave Zweifel, Editor emeritus
- Founded: December 13, 1917
- Political alignment: Progressivism
- Headquarters: Madison, Wisconsin, United States
- Circulation: 943 (as of 2022)
- Sister newspapers: Wisconsin State Journal
- ISSN: 0749-4068
- OCLC number: 7351334
- Website: captimes.com

The Capital Times (or Cap Times) is a weekly newspaper published Wednesday in Madison, Wisconsin, by The Capital Times Company. The company also owns 50 percent of Capital Newspapers, which now does business as Madison Media Partners. The other half is owned by Lee Enterprises (NYSE: LEE). The Capital Times formerly published paper editions Mondays through Saturdays. The print version ceased daily (Monday–Saturday) paper publication with its April 26, 2008 edition. It became a primarily digital news operation while continuing to publish a weekly tabloid in print. Its weekly print publication is delivered with the Wisconsin State Journal on Wednesdays and distributed in racks throughout Madison.

== History ==
=== Early years ===
The Capital Times began publishing as an afternoon daily on December 13, 1917, competing directly with the Wisconsin State Journal. The Cap Times' founder, William T. Evjue, previously served as managing editor and business manager of the State Journal, a paper that had been a supporter of the progressive Robert La Follette, whom Evjue considered a hero. When La Follette began publicly opposing World War I, the pro-war State Journal abandoned La Follette. In response, Evjue abandoned the State Journal and formed his own newspaper, The Capital Times, one that would reflect the progressive views he espoused. The newspaper's motto was and continues to be "Wisconsin's Progressive Newspaper."

Rumors were spread that the new newspaper was editorially pro-German because of Evjue's support for the anti-war La Follette. As a result, shortly after publishing the first issue, The Capital Times faced an advertising boycott. Evjue, resolved to beat the boycott, visited nearby communities selling $1 subscriptions. By the summer of 1919, the newspaper had a circulation of over 10,000 and the advertising boycott ended. In November 1927, the paper launched a Sunday edition.

During the 1920s, The Capital Times co-owned the left-leaning magazine The Progressive along with the La Follette family.

=== Competition ===
Fierce competition continued between the Wisconsin State Journal and The Capital Times until 1948 when the newspapers could not afford to replace their aging equipment. After years of attempting to scoop each other and competing for advertising and circulation, the newspapers entered into consolidation talks in the hope of maintaining both newspapers.

After tense negotiations, Lee Enterprises, owner of the Wisconsin State Journal, and Evjue's Capital Times Company formed Madison Newspapers, Inc. (now Capital Newspapers) on November 15, 1948, to operate both newspapers under joint agency.

On February 1, 1949, the Wisconsin State Journal moved from afternoons to mornings and became the sole newspaper published on Sunday in the partnership. The Capital Times continued to publish on weekday afternoons and Saturday mornings.

=== The Evjue Foundation ===
Following the death of its founder, William T. Evjue, in 1970, his controlling interest in The Capital Times Company was transferred to The Evjue Foundation, established a few years earlier to make small donations to worthy causes. As explained in a section of The Capital Times' website devoted to the Foundation's history, proceeds from Evjue's bequest "must go to organizations that best exemplify the beliefs that he championed during his lifetime, causes that could improve the quality of life for all the people in the Dane County area." Accordingly, this bequest (initially valued at $13,450) makes the Evjue Foundation a major shareholder of The Capital Times Company. The foundation has donated more than $70 million since its inception.

=== Switch to digital focus ===
On February 7, 2008, with The Capital Times facing declining circulation (a problem facing the newspaper industry in general and afternoon dailies in particular), the paper announced it would cease daily print publication after April 26, 2008. From that point, it would focus on digital delivery at captimes.com as well as publish a widely distributed weekly print edition. The Capital Times appears weekly in a tabloid format (moving from its long-time broadsheet style) that is included with the Wisconsin State Journal and distributed free at newsstands in the Madison area. The move gained national attention as it involved a prominent daily newspaper shifting to full-time electronic news distribution while at the same time keeping a traditional (albeit non-daily) newspaper format.

As part of the move, The Capital Times saw its staff reduced over time from about 64 to 20 positions. Capital Times executive editor Paul Fanlund took the title of editor and today is editor and publisher. Dave Zweifel became editor emeritus; Zweifel had been with the paper since 1962 and editor since 1983.

In 2026, the paper's eight-member newsroom announced their intention to unionize and the publisher voluntarily recognized the union.

== The Cap Times today ==
=== Philosophy ===
While The Cap Times is vigorously progressive in its editorial voice, there is a firm demarcation between its opinion voices and its news reporters and editors. The two parts act separately.

=== Events and podcasts ===
Since 2015, the Cap Times has hosted regular community events featuring live discussions about public affairs and cultural topics. Cap Times Talks, a monthly series, began in May 2015 and movie critic Rob Thomas has hosted regular post-film chats in local theaters since early 2015. Cap Times Idea Fest, a multi-day ideas festival on a wide variety of public affairs and cultural topics, launched in fall 2017 and has become an annual event since then. The Cap Times also produces regular events such as: Cooking with the Cap Times featuring local and national chefs, along with an executive business series - Cap Times Power Hour where "Wisconsin Business Leaders Talk". During the pandemic production of a virtual music series - Cap Times Live featured local musical performances.
