= Mukwonago Chief =

Newspaper in Wisconsin

- Type: Weekly newspaper
- Publisher: Mukwonago Publications and Journal Communications
- Headquarters: Mukwonago, Wisconsin, United States

The Mukwonago Chief was an independent weekly newspaper based in Mukwonago, Wisconsin and published by Mukwonago Publications and more recently by Journal Communications. It was primarily distributed in Mukwonago, but also in other surrounding towns and villages.

The Mukwonago Chief began publication in 1889 by Dan L. & Lucy M. Camp and was independently owned and published weekly until its acquisition in 2017 by the Gannett Company, Inc.

When the Mukwonago Chief was purchased in 2017 it became part of the Milwaukee Journal Sentinel. In August 2017 as part of a reorganization, weekly publications of Journal Community Publishing Group were consolidated and limited to appearances inside the print editions of the Wednesday Milwaukee Journal Sentinel. The internet site of the Mukwonago Chief was moved to the website of the Journal Sentinel.
