= Stevens Point Journal =

Newspaper published in Stevens Point, Wisconsin

- Type: Daily newspaper
- Format: Broadsheet
- Owner: USA Today Co.
- Founded: 1853 (as the Wisconsin Lumberman)
- Website: stevenspointjournal.com

Stevens Point Journal is a digital and print newspaper published in Stevens Point, Wisconsin. It is owned by USA Today Co. and part of the USA Today Network.

== History ==
The Stevens Point Journal was founded in 1853 as the Wisconsin Lumberman. It was renamed the Stevens Point Journal in 1872.

In 1997, the newspaper was sold to the Thomson Corporation, at the time a major national publisher of newspaper which owned six other newspapers in Wisconsin. It was then included in the sale of Thomson's newspaper assets to Gannett in 2000. In 2022, Gannett eliminated the Journal's Saturday print edition.
