= Middleton Times-Tribune =

American weekly community newspaper based in Wisconsin

- Type: Weekly Newspaper
- Format: Broadsheet
- Owner: Finger Publishing
- Publisher: Dan Witte and Mark Witte
- Editor: Alec Finger
- Headquarters: Black Earth, Wisconsin
- Circulation: 1,364 (as of 2022)
- Website: middletontimes.com

The Middleton Times-Tribune is a weekly community newspaper in Middleton, Dane County, Wisconsin. It is published every Thursday by News Publishing Company, Inc. The Times-Tribune covers local politics, entertainment and sports in the city of Middleton, and the towns of Middleton, Westport, and Springfield.
