= Capital Newspapers =

Newspaper company in Wisconsin

- Company type: Corporation
- Founded: 1948
- Headquarters: Madison, Wisconsin, United States
- Services: Publishing
- Revenue: $121.5 million (▼ -0.4% FY '05 to '06)
- Operating income: $25.1 million (▼ -14.8% FY '05 to '06)
- Net income: $15.7 million (▼ -13.1% FY '05 to '06)
- Owner: Lee Enterprises and The Capital Times Company
- Number of employees: 500
- Website: www.captimes.com

Capital Newspapers is a partnership between Lee Enterprises and The Capital Times Company that operates 27 publications and several web sites in Wisconsin. The corporate name of the company is Madison Newspapers Inc. Capital Newspapers has nearly 400 employees.

== History ==
The Wisconsin State Journal was first published on December 2, 1839 as The Madison Express, an afternoon weekly in Madison. It changed its name in 1852 to the Wisconsin Daily Journal in 1852 and to its current name in 1860. In 1919, the newspaper was sold to Lee Newspaper Syndicate (now Lee Enterprises) by publisher Richard Lloyd Jones.

The Capital Times was founded in 1917 by the former managing editor of the Wisconsin State Journal, William T. Evjue. He quit the State Journal in the summer of 1917 after the newspaper abandoned support for Robert La Follette and his opposition to World War I. By December that year, he had raised enough funds to begin his own newspaper, an afternoon daily first published on December 13, 1917.

Lee Enterprises and Evjue's The Capital Times Company began discussing a partnership that would operate both newspapers in 1947. The new partnership began on November 15, 1948 as Madison Newspapers, Inc. On February 1, 1949, the Wisconsin State Journal moved from afternoons to mornings and was the sole newspaper published on Sunday in the partnership.

=== Central Wisconsin acquisitions ===
Madison Newspapers and Lee Enterprises acquired Independent Media Group, Inc.'s newspapers in Nebraska and Wisconsin on July 1, 2000. Of the purchased newspapers, Lee Enterprises purchased 18 in both states and Madison Newspapers acquired 11 in Wisconsin. The newspapers purchased the Portage Daily Register, the Baraboo News Republic, the Shawano Leader, Reedsburg Times Press, the Juneau County Star-Times, the Wisconsin Dells Events, the Sauk Prairie Eagle, the Shopper Stopper, and the Wisconsin Reminder. Central Wisconsin Newspapers, Inc., a subsidiary of Madison Newspapers, was created to manage the newspapers.

The Daily Citizen of Beaver Dam, two weekly newspapers, and five other publications were acquired by Central Wisconsin Newspapers, Inc., a subsidiary of Madison Newspapers, from Conley Publishing Group on April 1, 2002.

=== Name change ===
One year after completing the purchase of the Daily Citizen, Madison Newspapers changed its name to Capital Newspapers and integrated its two subsidiaries—Central Wisconsin Newspapers and Citizen Newspapers—in name only into the renamed company. The name change was strategic in order to identify itself as a regional newspaper company. According to the press release, the "change does not signal a significant reorganization and no job losses will occur because of this change. The newsrooms will remain separate and independent ...."

=== Sales to BlueLine ===
On October 3, 2006, Capital Newspapers completed the sale of the Shawano Leader and its commercial printing operations near Shawano to BlueLine Media Holdings LLC of Neenah. The Leader had a circulation of 6,500 daily and 7,200 on Sundays.

=== Changes to The Capital Times ===
The company's most recent change took place on April 26, 2008, when The Capital Times published its last daily print edition and started publishing primarily online. The Capital Times now consists of two interrelated products: its website, captimes.com, and a tabloid-style print edition, The Cap Times, distributed on Wednesdays.

The Capital Times Co. of Madison acquired WisPolitics.com the online subscription political news service, in February 2011. WisPolitics.com is operated as a wholly owned subsidiary, with no integration of staff or connection to the editorial philosophy of The Cap Times.

=== Printing press ===
The Capital Newspapers printing press also prints The Badger Herald which distributes 11,500 papers on Mondays and Thursdays and The Daily Cardinal which distributes 10,000 newspapers Monday through Thursday.

== Publications ==
- Agri-View
- Baraboo News Republic
- The Badger Herald
- Beaver Dam Daily Citizen
- Juneau County Star-Times
- Marketplace Rentals
- Monday Marketeer
- Monday Mini
- Portage Daily Register
- Shopper Stopper
- Shopper's View
- Shopping Reminder
- The Capital Times
- Wisconsin Dells Events
- Wisconsin State Journal
