= Wisconsin State Journal =

Daily newspaper in Madison, Wisconsin

- The July 27, 2005 front page of the Wisconsin State Journal
- Type: Daily newspaper
- Format: Broadsheet
- Owner: Lee Enterprises
- Publisher: Ross McDuffie
- Editor: Kelly Lecker
- Founded: 1839; 187 years ago (as the Madison Express)
- Headquarters: 1901 Fish Hatchery Road; Madison, WI 53713; United States
- Circulation: 49,140 Daily; 51,450 Sunday (as of 2023)
- ISSN: 0749-405X
- Website: madison.com

The Wisconsin State Journal is a daily newspaper published in Madison, Wisconsin by Lee Enterprises. The newspaper, the second largest in Wisconsin, is primarily distributed in a 19 county region in south-central Wisconsin. As of September 2018, the Wisconsin State Journal had an average weekday circulation of 51,303 and an average Sunday circulation of 64,820. The State Journal is the state's official newspaper of record, and statutes and laws passed are regarded as official seven days after the publication of a state legal notice.

The State Journal's editorial board earned the newsroom's first Pulitzer finalist honor in 2008 for its "persistent, high-spirited campaign against abuses in the governor's veto power." The state's constitution was amended after the innovative, multi-media editorial campaign and the governor's veto power was limited.

The staff of the Wisconsin State Journal was also a finalist for the Pulitzer Prize for Breaking News Reporting in 2012 for its coverage of the "27 days of around-the-clock protests" at the state Capitol during the 2011 Wisconsin protests.

== History ==
=== Founding ===
Founded by Madison Hotel proprietor William W. Wyman, the Madison Express was first published in Madison on December 2, 1839. The paper began as an afternoon weekly, but during legislative sessions would publish every other day. As a strong supporter of the Whig Party, the paper endorsed William Henry Harrison for president in 1840.

=== Atwood grows the paper ===
David Atwood was apprenticed as a printer with his brother's newspaper in Hamilton, New York before he arrived in Madison on Oct. 15, 1847. He soon became employed as a compositor and assistant editor at the Madison Express for $6 a week and board. He purchased the paper with partner Royal Buck in 1848, changing its name to the Wisconsin Express to expand its outlook. He also established the paper editorially as an outspoken opponent of slavery. In 1852 the weekly paper merged with Wyman's Wisconsin Statesman to become the Wisconsin Daily Palladium for three months. On Sept. 30, 1852 it changed its name again to the Wisconsin Daily Journal and to its current name in 1860. To bring in more revenue Atwood followed his brother's example in the east and began a lucrative sideline business of printing law books.

Atwood took on partners to share ownership of the newspaper, including George Gary (1855–1856). In 1858, Atwood was commissioned a major general in the Wisconsin Militia by Governor Alexander W. Randall, but still retained financial interest in the daily. He also partnered with Harrison Reed (1859–1861), a former Milwaukee Sentinel editor who later became a carpetbag governor of Florida during Reconstruction.

During Atwood's 41-year tenure as publisher, he was a state assemblyman (1861), an internal revenue assessor (1862–1866), a Madison mayor (1868–1869) and a U.S. representative to Congress (1870), all the while publishing the Wisconsin State Journal until his death in 1889. As mayor, Atwood sought to develop manufacturing in Madison, a position he could then applaud in his own paper.

=== Becoming a Republican organ ===
In the early 1850s Atwood was aided by Horace Rublee, who had left the University of Wisconsin to be the legislative reporter for the Democratic Madison Argus. In 1853 he was associate editor of the Journal and the next year Atwood's business partner. Rublee was well positioned to participate in the new state politics that emerged in response to the Kansas–Nebraska Act. As early as January 1854 the newspaper called for a mass convention of anti-slavery citizens to meet in Madison. After events such as slave Joshua Glover's liberation in Milwaukee and the birth of the Republican Party on March 20, 1854 in Ripon, WI intervened, the convention that founded the Wisconsin Republican Party was held at the capitol on July 13 with Rublee acting as party secretary and Atwood serving on the resolutions committee. Rublee later became the chairman of the state Republican Party from 1859–1869. In 1860 he extended an unsuccessful invitation to Abraham Lincoln to speak at the party convention in Madison. Rublee allied himself with Madison mayor, postmaster and state patronage boss Elisha W. Keyes to run the "Madison Regency", the state's Republican machine. Rublee later broke with Keyes over the latter's support of President Andrew Johnson's vetoes of Freedman legislation. J.O. Culver purchased Rublee's interest in the paper in 1868 after Rublee was appointed minister to Switzerland by President Ulysses S. Grant. Rublee later became editor of the Milwaukee Sentinel, while Culver retired in December 1876.

On July 10, 1861, the State Journal became the first newspaper to produce and sell ready-printed "patent insides", pages with Civil War news on one side but blank on the other, where the Baraboo Republic then printed its local news and advertising. Fostered by business manager John S. Hawks, this invention helped make many rural papers possible.

During the 1870s Hawks expanded the State Journal's printing of law books, picking up the contracts of a Chicago firm after it suffered a fire, and making the paper for a time the largest publisher of law books in the country. The paper's presses were also used for much of the state government's printing.

After Atwood's passing, the State Journal Printing Co. was formed as a stock company, with Horace A. "Hod" Taylor taking over the paper. Although he had managed newspapers in La Crosse and Hudson, WI and Stillwater, Minnesota he was not a journalist, but instead used the paper to further his strong political ambitions. Taylor ran for governor as a stalwart Republican in 1888, losing the nomination to William D. Hoard. He ran for governor again in 1894, but lost the nomination to William H. Upham. He later held a consularship in Marseilles, France, as well as an appointment as U.S. Railroad Commissioner.

=== Becoming a progressive paper ===
During the 1890s the paper's circulation began to catch up to its main rival, the Madison Democrat, due largely to the 1894 arrival of Yale-educated Amos Parker Wilder (father of playwright Thornton Wilder). Earning $30 a week as editor-in-chief, he later purchased a major interest in the paper. Wilder began to transform the State Journal into a more civic-minded newspaper, focusing on local problems but falling short of embarking on crusades. Originally a supporter of Governor Robert M. La Follette Sr. in 1900 and 1902, Wilder converted the paper's editorials to an anti-La Follette position for the price of $1,800, paid by a committee of seven Republican stalwarts fighting against La Follette's ultimately successful re-election in 1904. In 1906 President Theodore Roosevelt appointed Wilder U.S. consul to Hong Kong.

In Wilder's absence he put his business manager August Roden in charge, a typesetter who had come up through the ranks as reporter and later associate editor. Roden adopted the aggressive brand of muckraking journalism common to periodicals at the start of the 20th century. His greatest triumph began in 1907 with his crusade against the high rates and poor quality of Madison Gas & Electric's service. Following an almost daily barrage of damaging stories about the private utility, the State Journal hired an attorney to lodge a formal complaint with the state commission in charge of regulating gas and electric companies. In 1910 the paper succeeded in getting the state to force a reduction in MG&E's rates by nearly ten percent, setting a precedent that led to other rate roll-backs. Roden also oversaw the move of the State Journal in 1909 from a three-story limestone building at 119 East Washington Ave. to a new fireproof brick building located on South Carroll Street.

In 1911 Richard Lloyd Jones, an associate editor at the muckraking magazine Collier's, became interested in buying the paper from Wilder. U.S. Senator Robert M. La Follette Sr. encouraged this purchase to such a degree that he arranged for wealthy supporters of the progressive cause to lend Jones $85,000 of the $100,000 necessary to make the deal. Jones hired former State Journal reporter William T. Evjue as his managing editor. Jones ramped up the paper's already liberal views with hard-hitting, provocative editorials that attacked big business and brooked no compromise. Soon the State Journal was the leading progressive daily in Wisconsin. The paper made its first two endorsements of a Democrat for U.S. president (Woodrow Wilson, in 1912 and 1916), endorsing only four other Democrats for that office in its history. Under Jones the State Journal also became a steady advocate for Prohibition.

By 1913 the paper's circulation had increased but the paper was on the verge of bankruptcy. Jones called back Evjue from his honeymoon to take on the job of business manager. Within ten days he'd reduced a payroll of $2,200 a week to $1,300 by cutting staff. The paper also sought loans from wealthy progressives. New readers and advertisers were added with the help of a beefed up Sunday edition that included color comics, a pink sports section and a magazine supplement. Eventually circulation doubled.

=== World War I ===
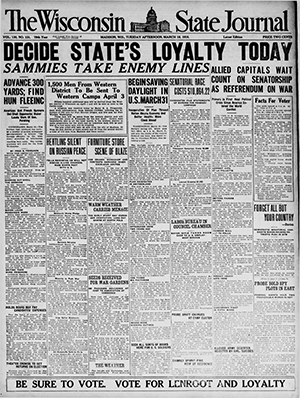
In the spring 1918 primary election the State Journal urged readers to vote for Republican Irvine L. Lenroot for U.S. Senate instead of Sen. Robert La Follette's preferred candidate, James Thompson.

As Congress debated entering World War I, Jones changed the paper's stance from one of pacifism to "preparedness." Jones quickly soured on Sen. La Follette's stand against the war. He used the paper to viciously attack his former friend and hero in scathing editorials that accused him of being disloyal and a pro-German agent. La Follette responded by suing Jones and the State Journal for libel. Jones was later forced to recant these accusations during the subsequent trial in 1919. Editor Evjue could no longer tolerate the personal attacks on the senator's character, and in September 1917 he resigned. Three months later he founded the Capital Times, which became the State Journal's main competition for the next nine decades.

As World War I raged on, Jones continued his virulent attacks on La Follette and anyone who supported him while heartily endorsing the formation of Loyalty Leagues. When La Follette criticized war profiteering by armaments manufacturers, Jones responded with charges of price-gouging by small local merchants, which drove some of those businesses to move their advertising to the Capital Times. In 1918 Jones' trumpeted his opposition to a La Follette-backed candidate for U.S. Senate, urging readers to "DECIDE STATE'S LOYALTY TODAY" in a blaring primary-day headline.

On July 19, 1919, Jones sold the State Journal to the Lee Newspaper Syndicate (now Lee Enterprises) of Davenport, IA, with A. M. Brayton becoming publisher and editor. In February 1921 the State Journal purchased its long-declining competitor, the Madison Democrat, ceasing its publication.

=== The formation of Madison Newspapers, Inc. ===
In June 1934 the State Journal and the Capital Times began to work in tandem by offering reduced advertising rates to clients who ran ads in both papers. The deal required the formation of two new corporations: the Wisconsin State Journal Co. and the Capital Times Co., both operating under the name Madison Newspapers. State Journal associate editor (and later publisher) Don Anderson regarded the agreement as "a shotgun wedding, conceived through the realization of both parties that we were broke." The deal did away with many competitive practices, which put the company in danger of violating state and federal antitrust laws. The Department of Justice investigated the arrangement in 1944, but passed on making charges.

Wisconsin State Journal covers the formation of the National Progressives of America (NPA) 1938

By 1947, Lee Newspaper Syndicate and Evjue's The Capital Times Company, owner of The Capital Times, shared a need for new presses and larger facilities, along with concerns about rising production and labor costs. They discussed a new partnership that would allow them to share a printing plant, fix prices and combine profits. With both papers always published in the afternoon, one paper would have to move to morning distribution in order for them to share the same press. Since afternoons were then deemed a more profitable time to hit the streets and doorsteps, they agreed that whichever paper moved to mornings would become the sole publisher of a Sunday edition to make up for the predicted loss in circulation. The new partnership began on November 15, 1948 as Madison Newspapers, Inc. On February 1, 1949, the Wisconsin State Journal moved from afternoons to mornings and was awarded the Sunday spot. The joint operating agreement between the two newspapers was further shielded by the federal Newspaper Preservation Act of 1970, which protected newspapers participating in such agreements from antitrust charges.

=== Supports Senator Joe McCarthy ===
The Wisconsin State Journal vociferously supported McCarthy throughout his political career, consistently defending his methods and attacking his detractors. The State Journal endorsed McCarthy every time he ran for state-wide office, five times in all, including three Republican primaries. The first time was in 1944, when McCarthy was little-known and challenged incumbent Republican Senator Alexander Wiley in the Republican primary. The State Journal was one of four papers to endorse McCarthy that year, the only one outside his home base in the Appleton area. Setting the tone for later endorsements, the 1944 introduction was an effusive, admiring portrait taking up the better part of an entire page with two pictures and an account from McCarthy himself, trumpeting the "Tail-Gunner Joe" myth propagated by McCarthy based on a "commendation" he almost certainly forged.

The State Journal endorsed McCarthy in the Republican primary and general elections in 1952, writing just before the general election in 1952:

Sen. McCarthy, despite, some mistakes, has done the nation a service. He has brought the anti-Communist fight out in the open, where it should be. He has forced the reluctant administration to act against Communists and fellow-travelers in the government and out. He has focused attention upon the serious domestic issue of infiltration by Russian agents. And, despite his critics and the most vicious personal attacks directed on a public figure in our history, he has slowly but surely produced evidence about persons and events ... evidence the American voters should have. "McCarthyism" has encouraged our citizens to ask some penetrating questions of "important" people, and demand honest answers.

=== The MNI strike ===
In 1976, Madison Newspapers, Inc. sought to upgrade its technology with the implementation of digital copy editing and typesetting. Without negotiating with the unions, MNI managers ordered the new equipment, and in April 1977 automated typesetting equipment was put into use. Seventeen printers were forced to give up their jobs and the wages of the remaining printers were cut by one third. On October 1, 1977 the five local unions at the MNI plant went on strike, including the International Typographers Union, the Newspaper Guild, the Wisconsin State Journal Employees Association, the pressmen's union and the mailers' union. Striking employees had founded the Madison Press Connection, which survived for a year and a half as a general-interest daily before folding in January 1980. The strike was finally settled with the last two unions in December 1982, with MNI paying a total of $1.5 million in settlement costs and $1 million in legal fees while achieving a union-free plant.

In 2004, the Wisconsin State Journal named Ellen Foley, former managing editor of the Philadelphia Daily News, as its first female editor-in-chief.

In November 2025, The Wisconsin State Journal moved to a six day printing schedule, eliminating its printed Monday edition.

=== Endorsements for U.S. president ===
Year	endorsement for president (*lost)	party
1840	William Henry Harrison	Whig
1844	Henry Clay*	Whig
1848	Zachary Taylor	Whig
1852	Winfield Scott*	Whig
1856	John C. Fremont*	Republican
1860	Abraham Lincoln	Republican
1864	Abraham Lincoln	Republican
1868	Ulysses S. Grant	Republican
1872	Ulysses S. Grant	Republican
1876	Rutherford B. Hayes	Republican
1880	James Garfield	Republican
1884	James Blaine*	Republican
1888	Benjamin Harrison	Republican
1892	Benjamin Harrison*	Republican
1896	William McKinley	Republican
1900	William McKinley	Republican
1904	Theodore Roosevelt	Republican
1908	William Taft	Republican
1912	Woodrow Wilson	Democratic
1916	Woodrow Wilson	Democratic
1920	Warren G. Harding	Republican
1924	Calvin Coolidge	Republican
1928	Herbert Hoover	Republican
1932	Herbert Hoover*	Republican
1936	Alf Landon*	Republican
1940	Wendell Willkie*	Republican
1944	Thomas Dewey*	Republican
1948	Thomas Dewey*	Republican
1952	Dwight Eisenhower	Republican
1956	Dwight Eisenhower	Republican
1960	Richard Nixon*	Republican
1964	no endorsement	n/a
1968	Richard Nixon	Republican
1972	Richard Nixon	Republican
1976	Gerald Ford*	Republican
1980	Ronald Reagan	Republican
1984	Ronald Reagan	Republican
1988	George H. W. Bush	Republican
1992	Bill Clinton	Democratic
1996	Bob Dole*	Republican
2000	George W. Bush	Republican
2004	George W. Bush	Republican
2008	Barack Obama	Democratic
2012	Mitt Romney*	Republican
2016	Hillary Clinton*	Democratic
2020	Joe Biden	Democratic
