= List of newspapers published by CNHI =

Newspapers currently or formerly published by CNHI include the following, sorted by state:

== Alabama ==
=== Sold ===
- Sold to Carpenter Media Group on May 23, 2024
  - The Cullman Times four times weekly (previously daily) of Cullman, Alabama
  - The News Courier four times weekly (previously daily) of Athens, Alabama
  - St. Clair News Aegis weekly of Pell City, Alabama

=== Defunct or merged ===
- The North Jefferson News weekly of Gardendale, Alabama; the Cullman Times briefly replaced the News with a page in its Wednesday edition, discontinued in 2020
- The Leeds News weekly of Leeds, Alabama, closed

== Florida ==
=== Defunct or merged ===
- Closed and merged with The Valdosta Daily Times in July 2020
  - The Mayo Free Press weekly of Mayo, Florida
  - The Jasper News weekly of Jasper, Florida
  - Suwannee Democrat weekly of Live Oak, Florida

== Georgia ==
=== Sold ===
- Sold to Carpenter Newsmedia LLC in August 2015, since renamed to Carpenter Media Group
  - Americus Times-Recorder daily of Americus, Georgia
  - Cordele Dispatch weekly (previously daily) of Cordele, Georgia
- Sold to Carpenter Media Group on May 23, 2024
  - The Daily Citizen, four times weekly (previously daily) of Dalton, Georgia and its sister papers:
    - Dalton Magazine magazine of Dalton, Georgia
    - El Informador weekly of Dalton, Georgia
  - The Moultrie Observer weekly (previously daily, then three times weekly) of Moultrie, Georgia
  - Thomasville Times-Enterprise five times weekly (previously daily) of Thomasville, Georgia
  - The Tifton Gazette weekly (previously daily, then three times weekly) of Tifton, Georgia and its sister weekly:
    - Tifton Scene weekly of Tifton, Georgia
  - The Union-Recorder three times weekly (previously daily) of Milledgeville, Georgia and its sister weekly:
    - Lake Oconee Breeze weekly of Milledgeville, Georgia
  - The Valdosta Daily Times four times weekly (previously daily) of Valdosta, Georgia

=== Defunct or merged ===
  - Ellaville Sun of Ellaville, Georgia, merged with the Americus Times-Recorder

== Illinois ==
- Commercial-News three times weekly (previously daily) of Danville, Illinois
- Effingham Daily News three times weekly (previously daily) of Effingham, Illinois

=== Defunct or merged newspapers ===
- Mt. Vernon Register-News - three days per week (previously daily) of Mount Vernon, Illinois, and its sister weekly, McLeansboro Times-Leader weekly of McLeansboro, Illinois, both closed in February 2018
- Shelbyville Daily Union of Shelbyville, Illinois - former daily newspaper that switched to digital-only in May 2020, merged into the Effingham Daily News as of July 2021

== Indiana ==
- News and Tribune five days per week (previously two separate dailies) of Jeffersonville, Indiana and New Albany, Indiana
- The Goshen News five days per week (previously daily) of Goshen, Indiana
- Greensburg Daily News three days per week (previously five) of Greensburg, Indiana
- The Herald Bulletin five days per week (previously daily) of Anderson, Indiana
- Kokomo Tribune five days per week (previously daily) of Kokomo, Indiana
- The Lebanon Reporter three days per week (previously five) of Lebanon, Indiana
- Pharos-Tribune five days per week (previously six) of Logansport, Indiana
- Tribune-Star five days per week (previously daily) of Terre Haute, Indiana
- Washington Times Herald twice weekly (previously daily, then three times weekly) of Washington, Indiana

=== Defunct or merged newspapers ===
- Highflyer weekly of Carmel, Indiana, closed in 2000
- Hancock County Image weekly of Greenfield, Indiana, closed in 2001
- Hendricks County Flyer weekly of Avon, Indiana, closed in May 2019
- Batesville Herald-Tribune weekly of Batesville, Indiana, closed and merged with the Greensburg Daily News in 2020
- Rushville Republican twice weekly (previously three days) of Rushville, Indiana, closed and merged with the Greensburg Daily News in 2020
- The Zionsville Times Sentinel weekly of Zionsville, Indiana, merged with The Lebanon Reporter in 2020

== Iowa ==
- Clinton Herald three days per week (previously daily) of Clinton, Iowa
- The Oskaloosa Herald weekly of Oskaloosa, Iowa
- Ottumwa Courier twice weekly (previously daily, then three times weekly) of Ottumwa, Iowa

=== Defunct or merged newspapers ===
- Daily Iowegian daily of Centerville, Iowa, closed and merged with Ottumwa Daily Courier in May 2020
- Journal-Express weekly of Knoxville, Iowa, closed and merged with The Oskaloosa Herald in May 2020
- Pella Chronicle weekly of Pella, Iowa, closed and merged with The Oskaloosa Herald in May 2020

== Kansas ==
- Farm Talk weekly of Parsons, Kansas

== Kentucky ==
- Commonwealth Journal daily of Somerset, Kentucky
- The Daily Independent five days per week (previously daily) of Ashland, Kentucky
- McCreary County Record weekly of Whitley City, Kentucky
- Richmond Register three days a week (previously six, then five) of Richmond, Kentucky
- Madison County Advertiser weekly of Richmond, Kentucky
- The Sentinel Echo weekly of London, Kentucky
- The Times-Tribune four days a week (previously six) of Corbin, Kentucky

=== Defunct or merged newspapers ===
- Glasgow Daily Times three days a week (previously six) of Glasgow, Kentucky, closed on June 9, 2020
- Grayson Journal Enquirer weekly of Grayson, Kentucky, closed and merged with The Daily Independent in May 2020
- Greenup County News-Times weekly of Greenup, Kentucky, closed and merged with The Daily Independent in May 2020
- Olive Hill Times weekly of Olive Hill, Kentucky, closed and merged with The Daily Independent in May 2020
- Morehead News weekly of Morehead, Kentucky, closed and merged with The Daily Independent in May 2020
- Wayne County Outlook weekly of Monticello, Kentucky, closed May 28, 2020

== Maryland ==
- Cumberland Times-News daily of Cumberland, Maryland 5 days per week previously daily

== Massachusetts ==
- The Daily News of Newburyport of Newburyport, Massachusetts
- The Eagle-Tribune daily of North Andover, Massachusetts and its sister weeklies:
  - The Andover Townsman weekly of Andover, Massachusetts
  - The Haverhill Gazette weekly of Haverhill, Massachusetts
- Gloucester Daily Times of Gloucester, Massachusetts
- The Salem News daily of Salem, Massachusetts

== Michigan ==
- Traverse City Record-Eagle daily of Traverse City, Michigan and its sister weekly:
  - North Coast of Traverse City, Michigan

== Minnesota ==
- The Free Press daily of Mankato, Minnesota and its sister weekly:
  - The Land weekly of Mankato, Minnesota

== Mississippi ==
- The Meridian Star daily of Meridian, Mississippi
- The Newton Record weekly of Newton, Mississippi

== Missouri ==
- The Joplin Globe daily of Joplin, Missouri

== New Hampshire ==
- Carriage Towne News weekly of Kingston, New Hampshire
- Derry News-Weekender weekly of Derry, New Hampshire

== New York ==
- The Daily Star five days per week (previously daily) of Oneonta, New York and its sister weekly:
  - Cooperstown Crier of Cooperstown, New York
- Lockport Union-Sun & Journal three times weekly (previously daily, then five times weekly) of Lockport, New York
- Niagara Gazette five days per week (previously daily) of Niagara Falls, New York
- Press-Republican daily of Plattsburgh, New York

=== Defunct or merged newspapers ===
- Albion Advertiser weekly of Albion, New York, closed in May 2013
- The Journal-Register daily of Medina, New York, closed in May 2014.
- Tonawanda News daily of North Tonawanda, New York, closed January 31, 2015.

== North Carolina ==
- The Transylvania Times published Mondays and Thursdays in Transylvania County, North Carolina

== Ohio ==
- Star Beacon daily of Ashtabula, Ohio

== Oklahoma ==
- The Ada News three days a week (previous daily) of Ada, Oklahoma
- The American weekly of Moore, Oklahoma
- Claremore Daily Progress daily of Claremore, Oklahoma
- The Daily Times of Pryor, Oklahoma
- The Duncan Banner daily of Duncan, Oklahoma
- Enid News & Eagle daily of Enid, Oklahoma
- The Express-Star daily of Chickasha, Oklahoma
- McAlester News-Capital daily of McAlester, Oklahoma
- Muskogee Phoenix daily of Muskogee, Oklahoma
- News Press daily of Stillwater, Oklahoma
- The Norman Transcript daily of Norman, Oklahoma
- Pauls Valley Daily Democrat of Pauls Valley, Oklahoma
- Stilwell Democrat Journal weekly of Stilwell, Oklahoma
- Tahlequah Daily Press of Tahlequah, Oklahoma
- Waurika News Democrat weekly of Waurika, Oklahoma
- The Woodward News daily of Woodward, Oklahoma

=== Defunct or merged newspapers ===
- The Edmond Sun daily of Edmond, Oklahoma, closed in May 2020, leaving no archive.
- The Daily Times (Pryor) in Pryor, Oklahoma, closed in April 2017, leaving no archive.

== Pennsylvania ==
- The Herald daily of Sharon, Pennsylvania and its sister publications:
  - Allied News twice weekly of Grove City, Pennsylvania
  - Hubbard Press weekly of Hubbard, Ohio
  - Mercer County Business Chronicle monthly business magazine
  - Life & Times, The magazine with senior flair monthly senior citizens magazine
  - View and Voices, a magazine for women monthly women's magazine
- The Daily Item of Sunbury, Pennsylvania
  - The Danville News weekly of Danville, Pennsylvania
- The Meadville Tribune daily of Meadville, Pennsylvania
- New Castle News daily of New Castle, Pennsylvania
- The Tribune-Democrat daily of Johnstown, Pennsylvania
- Aldia News the Weekly of Philadelphia, Pennsylvania

== Tennessee ==
- Crossville Chronicle weekly of Crossville, Tennessee

== Texas ==
- Athens Daily Review of Athens, Texas
- Cedar Creek Pilot weekly of Gun Barrel City, Texas
- Cleburne Times-Review daily of Cleburne, Texas
- Corsicana Daily Sun of Corsicana, Texas
- Gainesville Daily Register of Gainesville, Texas
- Herald-Banner daily of Greenville, Texas, and associated weeklies:
  - Rockwall County Herald-Banner weekly of Rockwall, Texas
  - Royse City Herald-Banner weekly of Royse City, Texas
- The Huntsville Item daily of Huntsville, Texas
- Jacksonville Daily Progress of Jacksonville, Texas
- Mexia News tri-weekly of Mexia, Texas
- The Orange Leader daily of Orange, Texas
- Palestine Herald-Press daily of Palestine, Texas
- The Port Arthur News daily of Port Arthur, Texas
- Weatherford Democrat daily of Weatherford, Texas, and its sister weekly:
  - The Parker County Shopper weekly of Weatherford, Texas

=== Defunct or merged newspapers ===
- Mineral Wells Index twice-weekly of Mineral Wells, Texas, closed and merged with the Weatherford Democrat in May 2020

== West Virginia ==
- The Register-Herald daily of Beckley, West Virginia, and its sister weeklies:
  - The Fayette Tribune weekly of Oak Hill, West Virginia
  - Montgomery Herald weekly of Montgomery, West Virginia
- Times West Virginian daily of Fairmont, West Virginia
- Bluefield Daily Telegraph of Bluefield, West Virginia, and its sister weekly:
  - Princeton Times weekly of Princeton, West Virginia
