= News media endorsements in the 2020 United States presidential election =

Various newspapers and magazines endorsed candidates in the 2020 United States presidential election, as follows. Tables below also show which candidate each publication endorsed in the 2016 United States presidential election (where known) and include only endorsements for the general election. Primary endorsements are separately listed - see News media endorsements in the 2020 United States presidential primaries.

== Daily newspapers ==
Newspaper	2020 endorsement	Endorsement date	City	State	2016 endorsement
The Dallas Morning News	No endorsement	February 16	Dallas	Texas	Hillary Clinton
Sun-Sentinel	Joe Biden	August 21	Fort Lauderdale	Florida	Hillary Clinton
Orlando Sentinel	Joe Biden	August 21	Orlando	Florida	None
Chicago Sun-Times (Note: After the 2008 election, the Chicago Sun-Times, along with other newspapers such as the Atlanta Journal-Constitution, Dayton Daily News, Knoxville News Sentinel, Milwaukee Journal Sentinel, St. Paul Pioneer Press, The Tuscaloosa News, and Sarasota Herald-Tribune, announced that they would discontinue their tradition of endorsements. In 2016, the Chicago Sun-Times reversed its decision.)	Joe Biden	August 21	Chicago	Illinois	Hillary Clinton
Seattle Times	Joe Biden	August 21	Seattle	Washington	Hillary Clinton
Hi-Desert Star	Donald Trump	August 25	Yucca Valley	California	No endorsement
Santa Barbara News-Press	Donald Trump	September 1	Santa Barbara	California	Donald Trump
The Mercury News (Note: The editorial boards of The Mercury News and the East Bay Times, which are both part of the Bay Area News Group, published a joint endorsement.)	Joe Biden	September 5	San Jose	California	Hillary Clinton
East Bay Times	Joe Biden	September 5	Walnut Creek	California	Hillary Clinton
Los Angeles Times	Joe Biden	September 10	Los Angeles	California	Hillary Clinton
The Berkshire Eagle	Joe Biden	September 11	Pittsfield	Massachusetts	Hillary Clinton
Brattleboro Reformer	Joe Biden	September 13	Brattleboro	Vermont	None
Miami Herald (Note: Following a new policy by the owning company McClatchy, the editorial boards of all of its 30 papers, including Miami Herald, Kansas City Star, Sacramento Bee, Charlotte Observer, The News & Observer, and Fort Worth Star-Telegram, will only be permitted to make a presidential endorsement if they conduct interviews with both candidates beforehand, an option not feasible for most local newspapers.)	No endorsement	September 17	Miami	Florida	Hillary Clinton
Kansas City Star	No endorsement	September 17	Kansas City	Missouri	Hillary Clinton
The Sacramento Bee	No endorsement	September 17	Sacramento	California	Hillary Clinton
The Charlotte Observer	No endorsement	September 17	Charlotte	North Carolina	Hillary Clinton
The News & Observer	No endorsement	September 17	Raleigh	North Carolina	Hillary Clinton
Fort Worth Star-Telegram	No endorsement	September 17	Fort Worth	Texas	Not Donald Trump
Walla Walla Union-Bulletin	Joe Biden	September 18	Walla Walla	Washington	Hillary Clinton
Times Herald-Record	Joe Biden	September 20	Middletown	New York	
Detroit Free Press	Joe Biden	September 20	Detroit	Michigan	Hillary Clinton
Orange County Register	No endorsement	September 23	Anaheim	California	No endorsement
Chicago Tribune	Joe Biden	September 25	Chicago	Illinois	Gary Johnson
The Baltimore Sun	Joe Biden	September 25	Baltimore	Maryland	Hillary Clinton
Lincoln Journal Star	Joe Biden	September 26	Lincoln	Nebraska	Hillary Clinton
The Oregonian	Joe Biden	September 27	Portland	Oregon	None
Washington Post	Joe Biden	September 28	Washington	District of Columbia	Hillary Clinton
Times-Standard	Joe Biden	October 1	Eureka	California	Hillary Clinton
San Diego Union-Tribune	Joe Biden	October 2	San Diego	California	Hillary Clinton
San Francisco Chronicle	Joe Biden	October 3	San Francisco	California	Hillary Clinton
The Des Moines Register	Joe Biden	October 3	Des Moines	Iowa	Hillary Clinton
Las Vegas Review-Journal	Donald Trump	October 3	Las Vegas	Nevada	Donald Trump
Kennebec Journal	Joe Biden	October 4	Augusta	Maine	Hillary Clinton
Las Vegas Sun	Joe Biden	October 4	Las Vegas	Nevada	Hillary Clinton
The Scranton Times-Tribune	Joe Biden	October 4	Scranton	Pennsylvania	Hillary Clinton
Wisconsin State Journal	Joe Biden	October 4	Madison	Wisconsin	Hillary Clinton
The Repository	No endorsement	October 4	Canton	Ohio	No endorsement
Portland Press Herald	Joe Biden	October 5	Portland	Maine	Hillary Clinton
The New York Times	Joe Biden	October 6	New York	New York	Hillary Clinton
Boston Globe	Joe Biden	October 7	Boston	Massachusetts	Hillary Clinton
Arizona Daily Star	Joe Biden	October 8	Tucson	Arizona	None
The Palm Beach Post	Joe Biden	October 8	Palm Beach	Florida	None
Daily Herald	Joe Biden	October 8	Arlington Heights	Illinois	Hillary Clinton
The Gazette	Joe Biden	October 8	Cedar Rapids	Iowa	Hillary Clinton
Bangor Daily News	Joe Biden	October 8	Bangor	Maine	Hillary Clinton
Houston Chronicle	Joe Biden	October 8	Houston	Texas	Hillary Clinton
Kenosha News	Joe Biden	October 8	Kenosha	Wisconsin	Hillary Clinton
Tampa Bay Times	Joe Biden	October 9	St. Petersburg	Florida	Hillary Clinton
Minneapolis Star Tribune	Joe Biden	October 9	Minneapolis	Minnesota	Hillary Clinton
Daily Hampshire Gazette	Joe Biden	October 9	Northampton	Massachusetts	Hillary Clinton
St. Louis Post-Dispatch	Joe Biden	October 10	St. Louis	Missouri	Hillary Clinton
The York Dispatch	Joe Biden	October 10	York	Pennsylvania	
The Keene Sentinel	Joe Biden	October 10	Keene	New Hampshire	Hillary Clinton
Newsday	Joe Biden	October 10	Long Island	New York	Hillary Clinton
The Press Democrat	Joe Biden	October 10	Santa Rosa	California	Hillary Clinton
Chico Enterprise-Record	Joe Biden	October 11	Chico	California	None
Santa Cruz Sentinel	Joe Biden	October 11	Santa Cruz	California	Hillary Clinton
The News-Gazette (Note: This was the first time this publication endorsed the Democratic presidential candidate in a general election.)	Joe Biden	October 11	Champaign	Illinois	None
The Dispatch / The Rock Island Argus	Joe Biden	October 11	Moline	Illinois	None
Quad-City Times	Joe Biden	October 11	Davenport	Iowa	Hillary Clinton
The Capital	Joe Biden	October 11	Annapolis	Maryland	None
Omaha World-Herald	Joe Biden	October 11	Omaha	Nebraska	Hillary Clinton
The Star-Ledger	Joe Biden	October 11	Newark	New Jersey	Hillary Clinton
The Plain Dealer	Joe Biden	October 11	Cleveland	Ohio	Hillary Clinton
The Bulletin	Joe Biden	October 11	Bend	Oregon	Hillary Clinton
Philadelphia Inquirer	Joe Biden	October 11	Philadelphia	Pennsylvania	Hillary Clinton
The Citizens' Voice	Joe Biden	October 11	Wilkes-Barre	Pennsylvania	Hillary Clinton
Beaumont Enterprise	Joe Biden	October 11	Beaumont	Texas	Hillary Clinton
San Antonio Express-News	Joe Biden	October 11	San Antonio	Texas	Hillary Clinton
Laredo Morning Times	Joe Biden	October 13	Laredo	Texas	None
Marin Independent Journal	Joe Biden	October 14	San Rafael	California	Hillary Clinton
Columbus Dispatch	Joe Biden	October 14	Columbus	Ohio	Hillary Clinton
Honolulu Star-Advertiser	Joe Biden	October 15	Honolulu	Hawaii	Hillary Clinton
Asheville Citizen-Times	Joe Biden	October 15	Asheville	North Carolina	Hillary Clinton
The Ann Arbor News	No endorsement	October 15	Ann Arbor	Michigan	Hillary Clinton
The Grand Rapids Press	No endorsement	October 15	Grand Rapids	Michigan	Hillary Clinton
Stamford Advocate	Joe Biden	October 16	Stamford	Connecticut	Hillary Clinton
The Intelligencer	No endorsement	October 16	Doylestown	Pennsylvania	
Bucks County Courier Times	No endorsement	October 16	Levittown	Pennsylvania	
Buffalo News	Joe Biden	October 17	Buffalo	New York	Hillary Clinton
The Sun Chronicle	Joe Biden	October 17	Attleboro	Massachusetts	
The Oklahoman	No endorsement	October 17	Oklahoma City	Oklahoma	Donald Trump
The Decatur Daily	Joe Biden	October 18	Decatur	Alabama	Hillary Clinton
Times Union	Joe Biden	October 18	Albany	New York	Hillary Clinton
El Nuevo Día	Joe Biden	October 18	Guaynabo	Puerto Rico	None
The Republican	Joe Biden	October 18	Springfield	Massachusetts	Hillary Clinton
Hartford Courant	Joe Biden	October 18	Hartford	Connecticut	Hillary Clinton
The Jersey Journal	Joe Biden	October 18	Secaucus	New Jersey	Hillary Clinton
Austin American-Statesman	Joe Biden	October 18	Austin	Texas	None
Arkansas Democrat-Gazette (Note: The editorial suggests that Trump might be preferable to Biden, but does not outright endorse him.)	No endorsement	October 18	Little Rock	Arkansas	No endorsement
The Florida Times-Union (Note: The editor announced that the publication no longer had the resources to provide endorsements as a public service and that the 2016 endorsement was forced by the previous owners.)	No endorsement	October 18	Jacksonville	Florida	Donald Trump
The Dominion Post	Joe Biden	October 19	Morgantown	West Virginia	
USA Today (Note: This is USA Today's first-ever explicit endorsement of a presidential candidate in its 38-year history.)	Joe Biden	October 20	McLean	Virginia	Not Trump
La Opinión	Joe Biden	October 20	Los Angeles	California	Hillary Clinton
Oroville Mercury-Register	Joe Biden	October 22	Oroville	California	No endorsement
The Record	Joe Biden	October 23	Hackensack	New Jersey	Hillary Clinton
The Durango Herald	Joe Biden	October 23	Durango	Colorado	
The Salt Lake Tribune (Note: In 2019, The Salt Lake Tribune re-organized as a non-profit corporation. It is therefore forbidden by federal law from making endorsements of candidates for political office.)	No endorsement	October 23	Salt Lake City	Utah	Hillary Clinton
Valley News	Joe Biden	October 24	Lebanon	New Hampshire	Hillary Clinton
Chattanooga Times Free Press (Note: The Chattanooga Times Free Press maintains separate editorial pages for its Times and Free Press components since the Times and Free Press merged in 1999. The Times endorsed Biden, and the Free Press did not endorse a candidate. In 2016, the Times endorsed Clinton, and the Free Press did not endorse a candidate. The editorials were written by the paper's opinion editors, Pam Sohn for the Times and Clint Cooper for the Free Press, as they were the only local opinion writers employed by the Times and Free Press editorial pages.)	Split endorsement	October 24	Chattanooga	Tennessee	Split endorsement
The Eagle-Tribune	Joe Biden	October 24	North Andover	Massachusetts	Hillary Clinton
New Hampshire Union Leader (Note: This was the first time this publication endorsed a Democratic presidential candidate in a general election in 100 years.)	Joe Biden	October 24	Manchester	New Hampshire	Gary Johnson
Savannah Morning News	No endorsement	October 24	Savannah	Georgia	Donald Trump
The Topeka Capital-Journal	Joe Biden	October 24	Topeka	Kansas	Donald Trump
Iowa City Press-Citizen	Joe Biden	October 24	Iowa City	Iowa	Hillary Clinton
Record-Journal	Joe Biden	October 24	Meriden	Connecticut	None
The Daily Item	Joe Biden	October 24	Sunbury	Pennsylvania	Hillary Clinton
Vallejo Times-Herald	Joe Biden	October 25	Vallejo	California	
Concord Monitor	Not Donald Trump	October 25	Concord	New Hampshire	
The New York Sun	Donald Trump	October 25	Manhattan	New York	
The Reporter	Joe Biden	October 25	Vacaville	California	
Mankato Free Press	Joe Biden	October 25	Mankato	Minnesota	Hillary Clinton
The Philadelphia Tribune	Joe Biden	October 25	Boston	Massachusetts	None
El Paso Times	Joe Biden	October 25	El Paso	Texas	Hillary Clinton
The Spokesman-Review (Note: The editorial was solely overseen by publisher William Stacey Cowles; the paper is owned by the Cowles Company. Two days after the editorial's publication, the paper announced it would no longer make political endorsements.)	Donald Trump	October 25	Spokane	Washington	Hillary Clinton
The Gazette	Donald Trump	October 25	Colorado Springs	Colorado	None
New York Post	Donald Trump	October 26	New York	New York	None
Gloucester Daily Times	Joe Biden	October 26	Cape Ann	Massachusetts	None
The Times Record	Joe Biden	October 26	Brunswick	Maine	None
The Daily News of Newburyport	Joe Biden	October 26	Newburyport	Massachusetts	None
The Salem News	Joe Biden	October 26	Salem	Massachusetts	Hillary Clinton
The Washington Times	Donald Trump	October 26	Washington	District of Columbia	Donald Trump
Boston Herald	Donald Trump	October 27	Boston	Massachusetts	No endorsement
The Patriot-News	Joe Biden	October 28	Mechanicsburg	Pennsylvania	None
Detroit News	No endorsement	October 28	Detroit	Michigan	Gary Johnson
The Citizen	Joe Biden	October 29	Auburn	New York	
The Recorder	Joe Biden	October 29	Greenfield	Massachusetts	
The Daily Nonpareil	Joe Biden	October 30	Council Bluffs	Iowa	
Eau Claire Leader-Telegram	Joe Biden	October 30	Eau Claire	Wisconsin	
The Post-Standard	Joe Biden	October 30	Syracuse	New York	Hillary Clinton
Charleston Gazette-Mail	Joe Biden	October 30	Charleston	West Virginia	
The Daily Star	Joe Biden	October 30	Oneonta	New York	
Tribune-Star	Joe Biden	October 30	Terre Haute	Indiana	Hillary Clinton
The Clarion-Ledger	No endorsement	October 30	Jackson	Mississippi	No endorsement
Hattiesburg American	No endorsement	October 30	Hattiesburg	Mississippi	No endorsement
The Cincinnati Enquirer (Note: The Enquirer stopped endorsing candidates in 2018.)	No endorsement	October 30	Cincinnati	Ohio	Hillary Clinton
Columbia Daily Tribune	No endorsement	October 31	Columbia	Missouri	
Long Beach Press-Telegram	No endorsement	October 31	Long Beach	California	No endorsement
The Daily News	No endorsement	October 31	Batavia	New York	
The Herald Bulletin	Joe Biden	October 31	Anderson	Indiana	Hillary Clinton
The Tribune-Democrat	Joe Biden	October 31	Johnstown	Pennsylvania	Hillary Clinton
Republican-American	Donald Trump	October 31	Waterbury	Connecticut	Donald Trump
The Brunswick News	Donald Trump	October 31	Brunswick	Georgia	
Pittsburgh Post-Gazette (Note: This was the first time the Pittsburgh Post-Gazette endorsed a Republican since 1972 and the first time The Blade of Toledo, Ohio, endorsed a Republican since 1988, after the 2018 consolidation of the two publications' editorial departments and the appointment of editorial page editor Keith Burris.)	Donald Trump	November 1	Pittsburgh	Pennsylvania	Hillary Clinton
The Blade	Donald Trump	November 1	Toledo	Ohio	No endorsement (Note: In 2016, The Blade published a voter guide but did not make an explicit endorsement of one candidate over another.)
Staten Island Advance	Joe Biden	November 1	Staten Island	New York	
New York Daily News (Note: Before this endorsement, the New York Daily News's editorial board published one of 99 reasons for their decision every day until election day, starting on July 27.)	Joe Biden	November 1	New York	New York	Hillary Clinton
Erie Times-News	No endorsement	November 1	Erie	Pennsylvania	
Journal Star	No endorsement	November 1	Peoria	Illinois	
Wausau Pilot & Review	No endorsement	November 1	Wausau	Wisconsin	
Times West Virginian	No endorsement	November 1	Fairmont	West Virginia	
Herald-Whig	No endorsement	November 1	Quincy	Illinois	
Northeast Mississippi Daily Journal	No endorsement	November 1	Tupelo	Mississippi	
St. Joseph News-Press	Donald Trump	November 3	St. Joseph	Missouri	

== Weekly newspapers ==
Newspaper	2020 endorsement	Endorsement date	City	State	2016 endorsement
The Chicago Crusader	Joe Biden	March 17	Chicago	Illinois	Hillary Clinton
News-Register	Joe Biden	September 18	McMinnville	Oregon	
Black Voice News	Joe Biden	September 21	Riverside	California	None
Bay Windows	Joe Biden	September 23	Boston	Massachusetts	Hillary Clinton
Between the Lines	Joe Biden	September 23	Livonia	Michigan	Hillary Clinton
Dallas Voice	Joe Biden	September 23	Dallas	Texas	Hillary Clinton
Gay City News	Joe Biden	September 23	New York	New York	Hillary Clinton
Philadelphia Gay News	Joe Biden	September 23	Philadelphia	Pennsylvania	Hillary Clinton
Washington Blade	Joe Biden	September 23	Washington	District of Columbia	Hillary Clinton
Windy City Times	Joe Biden	September 23	Chicago	Illinois	Hillary Clinton
The Georgia Voice	Joe Biden	September 23	Atlanta	Georgia	Hillary Clinton
Los Angeles Blade	Joe Biden	September 23	Los Angeles	California	Hillary Clinton
Watermark Online	Joe Biden	September 23	Orlando	Florida	Hillary Clinton
The Jewish Voice	Donald Trump	September 23	New York	New York	Donald Trump
Bay Area Reporter	Joe Biden	September 23	San Francisco	California	Hillary Clinton
La Gaceta	Joe Biden	September 25	Tampa	Florida	Hillary Clinton
The Charlotte Post	Joe Biden	September 27	Charlotte	North Carolina	
Ouachita Citizen	Donald Trump	September 30	West Monroe	Louisiana	
Charleston City Paper	Joe Biden	September 30	Charleston	South Carolina	Hillary Clinton
San Francisco Bay Guardian	Joe Biden	October 1	San Francisco	California	Hillary Clinton
South Florida Caribbean News	Joe Biden	October 2	Miami	Florida	
Austin Chronicle	Joe Biden	October 2	Austin	Texas	Hillary Clinton
Colorado Springs Independent	Joe Biden	October 7	Colorado Springs	Colorado	
Boulder Weekly	Joe Biden	October 8	Boulder	Colorado	Hillary Clinton
Monterey County Weekly	Joe Biden	October 8	Seaside	California	Hillary Clinton
News & Review	Joe Biden	October 8	Sacramento	California	Hillary Clinton
The Weekly Issue/El Semanario	Joe Biden	October 9	Greenwood Village	Colorado	
Sentinel Colorado	Joe Biden	October 12	Aurora	Colorado	
Winston-Salem Chronicle	Joe Biden	October 14	Winston-Salem	North Carolina	
The Stranger	Joe Biden	October 14	Seattle	Washington	Hillary Clinton
Bernardsville News	Joe Biden	October 14	Bernardsville	New Jersey	
Willamette Week	Joe Biden	October 14	Portland	Oregon	Hillary Clinton
The Georgetowner	Joe Biden	October 14	Washington	DC	Hillary Clinton
The Capital Times	Joe Biden	October 14	Madison	Wisconsin	Hillary Clinton
The Martha's Vineyard Times	Joe Biden	October 14	Martha's Vineyard	Massachusetts	Hillary Clinton
Marysville Advocate	Joe Biden	October 14	Marysville	Kansas	
Northwest Asian Weekly	Joe Biden	October 15	Seattle	Washington	None
The Bay City Times	No endorsement	October 15	Bay City	Michigan	Hillary Clinton
The Flint Journal	No endorsement	October 15	Flint	Michigan	Hillary Clinton
Eugene Weekly	Joe Biden	October 15	Eugene	Oregon	
The Skanner	Joe Biden	October 16	Portland	Oregon	
The Jewish Press	Donald Trump	October 21	New York	New York	Donald Trump
Washington Jewish Week	Joe Biden	October 21	Rockville	Maryland	Hillary Clinton
Crested Butte News	Joe Biden	October 21	Crested Butte	Colorado	
The Source Weekly	Joe Biden	October 21	Bend	Oregon	Hillary Clinton
New York Carib News	Joe Biden	October 21	New York	New York	
Baltimore Jewish Times	Joe Biden	October 22	Owings Mills	Maryland	Hillary Clinton
Irish Voice	Not Donald Trump	October 23	New York	New York	
Falls Church News-Press	Joe Biden	October 23	Falls Church	Virginia	Hillary Clinton
Chicago Defender	Joe Biden	October 23	Chicago	Illinois	Hillary Clinton
The Philadelphia Tribune	Joe Biden	October 23	Philadelphia	Pennsylvania	Hillary Clinton
Orlando Weekly	Joe Biden	October 23	Orlando	Florida	None
City Pulse	Joe Biden	October 23	Lansing	Michigan	None
Caribbean National Weekly	Joe Biden	October 23	Fort Lauderdale	Florida	None
Derry News	Joe Biden	October 26	Derry	New Hampshire	
Louisiana Weekly	Joe Biden	October 26	New Orleans	Louisiana	None
Idaho Mountain Express	Joe Biden	October 28	Ketchum	Idaho	
Dorchester Reporter	Joe Biden	October 28	Dorchester	Massachusetts	
The St. Louis American	Joe Biden	October 28	St. Louis	Missouri	
Laurel Leader-Call	Donald Trump	October 28	Laurel	Mississippi	
Madison County Journal	Donald Trump	October 28	Ridgeland	Mississippi	
Storm Lake Times	Joe Biden	October 28	Storm Lake	Iowa	
Oklahoma Eagle	Joe Biden	October 29	Tulsa	Oklahoma	
Addison County Independent	Joe Biden	October 29	Middlebury	Vermont	
Riverhead News Review	Joe Biden	October 29	Mattituck	New York	
Anchorage Press	Brock Pierce	October 29	Anchorage	Alaska	
Gary Crusader	Joe Biden	October 29	Gary	Indiana	
Boston Irish Reporter	Joe Biden	October 29	Boston	Massachusetts	
New Pittsburgh Courier	Joe Biden	October 29	Pittsburgh	Pennsylvania	
Shelter Island Reporter	Joe Biden	October 30	Shelter Island	New York	
The Arab American News	Joe Biden	October 30	Dearborn	Michigan	
The Irish Echo	Joe Biden	October 31	New York	New York	
Tennessee Tribune	Joe Biden	November 1	Nashville	Tennessee	

== College and university newspapers ==
=== Summary of college and university newspapers ===
Candidate	Endorsements
Joe Biden	34
No endorsement	1

=== Endorsements ===
Newspaper	2020 endorsement	Endorsement date	City	State	2016 endorsement
The Slate (Shippensburg University)	Vote your conscience	September 29	Shippensburg	Pennsylvania	
The Maroon (Loyola University New Orleans)	Joe Biden	October 1	New Orleans	Louisiana	
The Daily Illini (University of Illinois at Urbana–Champaign)	Joe Biden	October 1	Champaign	Illinois	
The Shorthorn (University of Texas at Arlington)	Joe Biden	October 7	Arlington	Texas	None
The Beacon (University of Portland)	Joe Biden	October 8	Portland	Oregon	Hillary Clinton
The Justice (Brandeis University)	Joe Biden	October 10	Waltham	Massachusetts	
Daily Bruin (University of California, Los Angeles)	Joe Biden	October 12	Los Angeles	California	Hillary Clinton
North Texas Daily (University of North Texas)	Joe Biden	October 15	Denton	Texas	None
Iowa State Daily (Iowa State University)	Joe Biden	October 18	Ames	Iowa	Hillary Clinton
The Daily Iowan (University of Iowa)	Joe Biden	October 18	Iowa City	Iowa	Hillary Clinton
The Independent Florida Alligator (University of Florida)	Joe Biden	October 19	Gainesville	Florida	Hillary Clinton
The Emory Wheel (Emory University)	Joe Biden	October 26	Atlanta	Georgia	
The Michigan Daily (University of Michigan)	Joe Biden	October 26	Ann Arbor	Michigan	Hillary Clinton
The Cornell Daily Sun (Cornell University)	Joe Biden	October 27	Ithaca	New York	Hillary Clinton
The Daily Pennsylvanian (University of Pennsylvania)	Joe Biden	October 27	Philadelphia	Pennsylvania	Hillary Clinton
The Sewanee Purple (Sewanee: The University of the South)	Joe Biden	October 27	Sewanee	Tennessee	
The Miami Hurricane (University of Miami)	Joe Biden	October 28	Coral Gables	Florida	
Whitman Wire (Whitman College)	Joe Biden	October 28	Walla Walla	Washington	
The Rider News (Rider University)	Joe Biden	October 28	Lawrenceville	New Jersey	
The Daily Californian (University of California, Berkeley)	Joe Biden	October 29	Berkeley	California	
The Rocket (Slippery Rock University of Pennsylvania)	Joe Biden	October 30	Slippery Rock	Pennsylvania	
The Bowdoin Orient (Bowdoin College)	Joe Biden	October 30	Brunswick	Maine	
The Daily Targum (Rutgers University)	Joe Biden	October 30	New Brunswick	New Jersey	
The Columbia Chronicle (Columbia College Chicago)	Joe Biden	October 30	Chicago	Illinois	
Coast Report (Orange Coast College)	Joe Biden	October 30	Costa Mesa	California	
Daily Trojan (University of Southern California)	Joe Biden	October 30	Los Angeles	California	
The Record (College of Saint Benedict and Saint John's University)	Joe Biden	October 30	St. Joseph	Minnesota	
The Dartmouth (Dartmouth College)	Joe Biden	October 30	Hanover	New Hampshire	Hillary Clinton
The Quad (West Chester University)	Joe Biden	October 30	West Chester	Pennsylvania	
The Daily Cardinal (University of Wisconsin-Madison)	Joe Biden	October 30	Madison	Wisconsin	
The Georgetown Voice (Georgetown University)	Joe Biden	October 31	Washington	D.C.	
The Famuan (Florida A&M University)	Joe Biden	November 1	Tallahassee	Florida	
The Crimson White (University of Alabama)	Joe Biden	November 1	Tuscaloosa	Alabama	
The Pitt News (University of Pittsburgh)	Joe Biden	November 2	Pittsburgh	Pennsylvania	
Kent Stater (Kent State University)	Joe Biden	November 2	Kent	Ohio	

== High school newspapers ==
=== Summary of high school newspapers ===
Candidate	Endorsements
Joe Biden	1

=== Endorsements ===
Newspaper	2020 endorsement	Endorsement date	City	State	2016 endorsement
The Spectator (Stuyvesant High School)	Joe Biden	November 3	New York City	New York	

== Magazines ==
=== Summary of magazines ===
Candidate	Endorsements
Joe Biden	12
Donald Trump	2
No endorsement	1

=== Endorsements ===
Magazine	2020 endorsement	Endorsement date	2016 endorsement
Latino Magazine	Joe Biden		
The Advocate	Joe Biden	June 25	
Scientific American (Note: This was Scientific American's first-ever endorsement in a presidential race.)	Joe Biden	September 15	Not Donald Trump
The New Yorker	Joe Biden	September 28	Hillary Clinton
Ami Magazine	Donald Trump	September 30	
The Nation	Joe Biden	October 1	
Surfer (Note: This was Surfer Magazine's first-ever endorsement in a presidential race.)	Joe Biden	October 1	None
Brown Girl Magazine	Joe Biden	October 17	
Rolling Stone	Joe Biden	October 19	Hillary Clinton
The Atlantic	Joe Biden	October 22	Hillary Clinton
Natural Gas World	Joe Biden	October 26	
Washington Examiner (Note: The editor of the Washington Examiner, Seth Mandel, separately stated that he would not vote for Trump.)	Donald Trump	October 26	
Metro Weekly	Joe Biden	October 29	
Harper's Magazine	Joe Biden	November 2	
Christianity Today	No endorsement	November 2	

== Scientific journals ==
=== Summary of scientific journals ===
Candidate	Endorsements
Joe Biden	2
Not Donald Trump	1
No endorsement	1

=== Endorsements ===
Journal	2020 endorsement	Endorsement date	2016 endorsement
The Lancet Oncology	Joe Biden	October 5	None
The New England Journal of Medicine (Note: This was The New England Journal of Medicine's first-ever opinion on a presidential race in its 208-year history. (As it is owned by the non-profit Massachusetts Medical Society, it cannot legally endorse specific candidates for office.))	Not Donald Trump	October 7	None
Nature	Joe Biden	October 14	
The Lancet	Change	October 30	None

== Foreign periodicals ==
=== Summary of foreign periodicals ===
Candidate	Endorsements
Joe Biden	21
Donald Trump	1
Not Donald Trump	5
Howie Hawkins	1

=== Endorsements ===
Periodical	2020 endorsement	Endorsement date	City	Country	2016 endorsement
Kathimerini	Joe Biden	June 3	Piraeus	Greece	None
Waterloo Region Record	Joe Biden	August 14	Kitchener	Canada	
Global Times	Joe Biden	August 21	Beijing	China	
Libération	Joe Biden	August 21	Paris	France	
The Hindu	Joe Biden	August 22	Chennai	India	
Apple Daily	Donald Trump	September 2	Tseung Kwan O New Town	Hong Kong	
The Scotsman	Joe Biden	October 11	Edinburgh	United Kingdom	
Solidarity	Howie Hawkins	October 14	London	United Kingdom	Not Clinton / Not Trump
Hindustan Times	Joe Biden	October 23	New Delhi	India	None
El Universal	Joe Biden	October 25	Mexico City	Mexico	None
The Guardian	Joe Biden	October 28	London	United Kingdom	Hillary Clinton
The Economist	Joe Biden	October 29	London	United Kingdom	Hillary Clinton
Toronto Star	Joe Biden	October 30	Toronto	Canada	Not Donald Trump
The Irish Times	Joe Biden	October 30	Dublin	Ireland	
The Irish News	Joe Biden	October 31	Belfast	Northern Ireland	
The Sydney Morning Herald	Joe Biden	November 1	Sydney	Australia	Not Donald Trump
The Globe and Mail	Joe Biden	November 1	Toronto	Canada	
The Age	Joe Biden	November 1	Melbourne	Australia	Hillary Clinton
Times of Malta	Joe Biden	November 1	Valletta	Malta	Hillary Clinton
Irish Independent	Joe Biden	November 1	Dublin	Ireland	
Village	Joe Biden	November 1	Dublin	Ireland	
Sunday Independent	Joe Biden	November 1	Dublin	Ireland	Hillary Clinton
The Observer	Joe Biden	November 1	London	United Kingdom	Hillary Clinton
Morning Star	Not Donald Trump	November 2	London	United Kingdom	
The Independent	Not Donald Trump	November 2	London	United Kingdom	
Haaretz	Not Donald Trump	November 2	Tel Aviv	Israel	
The Gleaner	Not Donald Trump	November 3	Kingston	Jamaica	Not Donald Trump
Irish Examiner	Not Donald Trump	November 3	Cork	Ireland	

== Online news outlets ==
Online news	2020 endorsement	Endorsement date	City	State	2016 endorsement
FITSNews	Jo Jorgensen	October 2	Irmo	South Carolina	Donald Trump
LA Progressive	Joe Biden	October 5	Los Angeles	California	
cleveland.com	Joe Biden	October 11	Cleveland	Ohio	
World Politics Review	Joe Biden	October 14	Tampa	Florida	No endorsement
AsAmNews	Joe Biden	October 15	San Francisco	California	No endorsement
Florida Armenians	Joe Biden	October 26	Boca Raton	Florida	
Deerfield News	Joe Biden	October 27	Deerfield Beach	Florida	
PennLive	Joe Biden	October 31	Mechanicsburg	Pennsylvania	
Electrek	Joe Biden	October 31			
Vos Iz Neias?	Donald Trump	November 1			
The Sizzle Report	Joe Biden	November 2			
