= List of Michael Dukakis 1988 presidential campaign endorsements =

Endorsements list

This is a list of notable individuals and organizations who endorsed Michael Dukakis's campaign for president of the United States in the 1988 U.S. presidential election.

== U.S. Congress ==
=== U.S. Senate ===
==== Current ====
- Bill Bradley, U.S. Senator from New Jersey (1979–1997)
- Wyche Fowler, U.S. Senator from Georgia (1987–1993)
- Sam Nunn, U.S. Senator from Georgia (1972–1997)
- Paul Simon, U.S. Senator from Illinois (1985–1997), 1988 democratic candidate

=== U.S. House of Representatives ===
==== Current ====
- Albert Bustamante, TX-23 (1985–1993)
- Dennis E. Eckart, OH-22 (1981–1983), OH-11 (1983–1993)
- Dick Gephardt, MO-03 (1977–2005), 1988 democratic candidate
- Matthew G. Martínez, CA-30 (1982–1993), CA-31 (1993–2001)
- Bill Richardson, NM-03 (1983–1997)

== State, territorial, and tribal executive officials ==
=== Current governors ===
- Mario Cuomo, 52nd Governor of New York (1983–1994)
- Joe Frank Harris, 78th Governor of Georgia (1983–1991)
- Ray Mabus, 60th Governor of Mississippi (1988–1992)

=== Former ===
- Bruce Babbitt, 16th Governor of Arizona (1978–1987), 1988 democratic candidate

=== Current lieutenant governors ===
- Zell Miller, 8th Lieutenant Governor of Georgia (1975–1991)

=== Other ===
- John Sharp, Railroad Commissioner of Texas (1987–1991)

== State and territorial legislative officials ==
California State Assembly

- Tom Hayden, CA-44 (1982–1992)

Connecticut House of Representatives

- Irving J. Stolberg, Speaker (1987–1988)

Georgia House of Representatives

- Tom Murphy, Haralson County (1961–1966), GA-26 (1966–1969), GA-19 (1969–1973), GA-18 (1973–2003) and Speaker (1973–2003)

== Municipal and local officials ==
- Robert E. Colville, 17th District Attorney of Allegheny County (1976–1998)

== Newspapers, magazines, and other news media ==
- The Atlanta Journal-Constitution
- Aspen Daily News
- Bennington Banner
- The Berkshire Eagle
- The Boston Globe
- Brattleboro Reformer
- The Charlotte Observer
- Chattanooga Times Free Press
- Courier Journal
- Daily Camera
- The Daily Times
- Dayton Daily News
- The Daytona Beach News-Journal
- The Des Moines Register
- Detroit Free Press
- Edwardsville Intelligencer
- The Express-Star
- The Free Press
- The Fresno Bee
- The Greenwood Commonwealth
- Haverhill Gazette
- The Hawk Eye
- The Hutchinson News
- Intelligencer Journal
- The Kansas City Star
- Kansas City Times
- The Keene Sentinel
- The Lamar Daily News
- La Opinión
- Lexington Herald-Leader
- Mail Tribune
- The Miami News
- Minnesota Star Tribune
- Moberly Monitor-Index
- Newsday
- The New York Times
- The Orange Leader
- Philadelphia Daily News
- The Philadelphia Inquirer
- Pittsburgh Post-Gazette
- The Plain Dealer
- The Press-Enterprise
- Richmond County Daily Journal
- Rock Springs Daily Rocket-Miner
- Rutland Herald
- The Seattle Times
- Seminole Producer
- Southbridge News
- Staten Island Advance
- St. Petersburg Times
- Tallahassee Democrat
- The Tennessean
- Times Herald-Record
- Times Leader
- The Welch News
- The Wichita Eagle

== Organizations ==
- American Nurses Association
- League of Conservation Voters

== Labor Unions ==
- AFL-CIO
- American Federation of Teachers
- Civil Service Employees Association
- International Longshore and Warehouse Union
- National Education Association
- NewsGuild-CWA

== Notable individuals ==
- Barry Diller, businessman
- Judith Krantz, writer

Actors and filmmakers

- Ed Begley Jr., actor
- Richard Chamberlain, actor
- Olympia Dukakis, actress (cousin)
- Sally Field, actress
- Richard Gere, actor
- Harry Hamlin, actor
- Anne Jackson, actress
- Sally Kirkland, actress
- Norman Lear, producer
- Jack Nicholson, actor
- Leonard Nimoy, actor
- Tony Randall, actor
- Telly Savalas, actor
- Ally Sheedy, actress
- Oliver Stone, director and writer
- Eli Wallach, actor
- Shelley Winters, actress

Athletes

- Marvelous Marvin Hagler, boxer

Music

- Art Garfunkel, singer
- Carly Simon, singer

== Works cited ==
=== Books ===
- Moreland, Laurence; Steed, Robert; Baker, Tod, eds. (1991). The 1988 Presidential Election in the South: Continuity Amidst Change in Southern Party Politics. Praeger Publishers. ISBN 0275931455.

=== Newspapers ===
- "Bradley Gives an Assist to Dukakis Campaign". Omaha World-Herald. March 24, 1988. p. 47 – via Newspapers.com.
- "Cuomo endorses Dukakis". Brattleboro Reformer. June 9, 1988. p. 5 – via Newspapers.com.
- "Dukakis gets Hispanic boost". Tampa Bay Times. April 1, 1988. p. 18A – via Newspapers.com.
- "Hollywood stars coming out for favorite candidates". Ventura County Star. May 15, 1988. p. B6 – via Newspapers.com.
- "Paparazzi Politics". New York Daily News. March 6, 1988. p. 5A – via Newspapers.com.
- "These are the presidential candidates favored by members of Congress from Ohio". Akron Beacon Journal. February 12, 1988. p. A12. Archived from the original on July 23, 2024 – via Newspapers.com.
- McNeely, Dave (March 2, 1988). "'Converted' Hightower to give Jackson his blessing today". Austin American-Statesman. p. B3 – via Newspapers.com.
