= Niagara Gazette =

Daily newspaper

- Type: Daily newspaper
- Format: Broadsheet
- Owner: Community Newspaper Holdings Inc.
- Publisher: John Celestino
- News editor: Matt Winterhalter
- Founded: 1854 as the Niagara Falls Gazette
- Headquarters: 473 Third Street, Niagara Falls, New York, 14301 United States
- Circulation: 9,666 Daily (as of 2017)
- Website: niagara-gazette.com

The Niagara Gazette, also referred to as The Gazette, is a morning daily newspaper published in Niagara Falls, New York, United States, which covers several parts of Niagara County, including the Town of Niagara, and the City of Niagara Falls.

== History ==
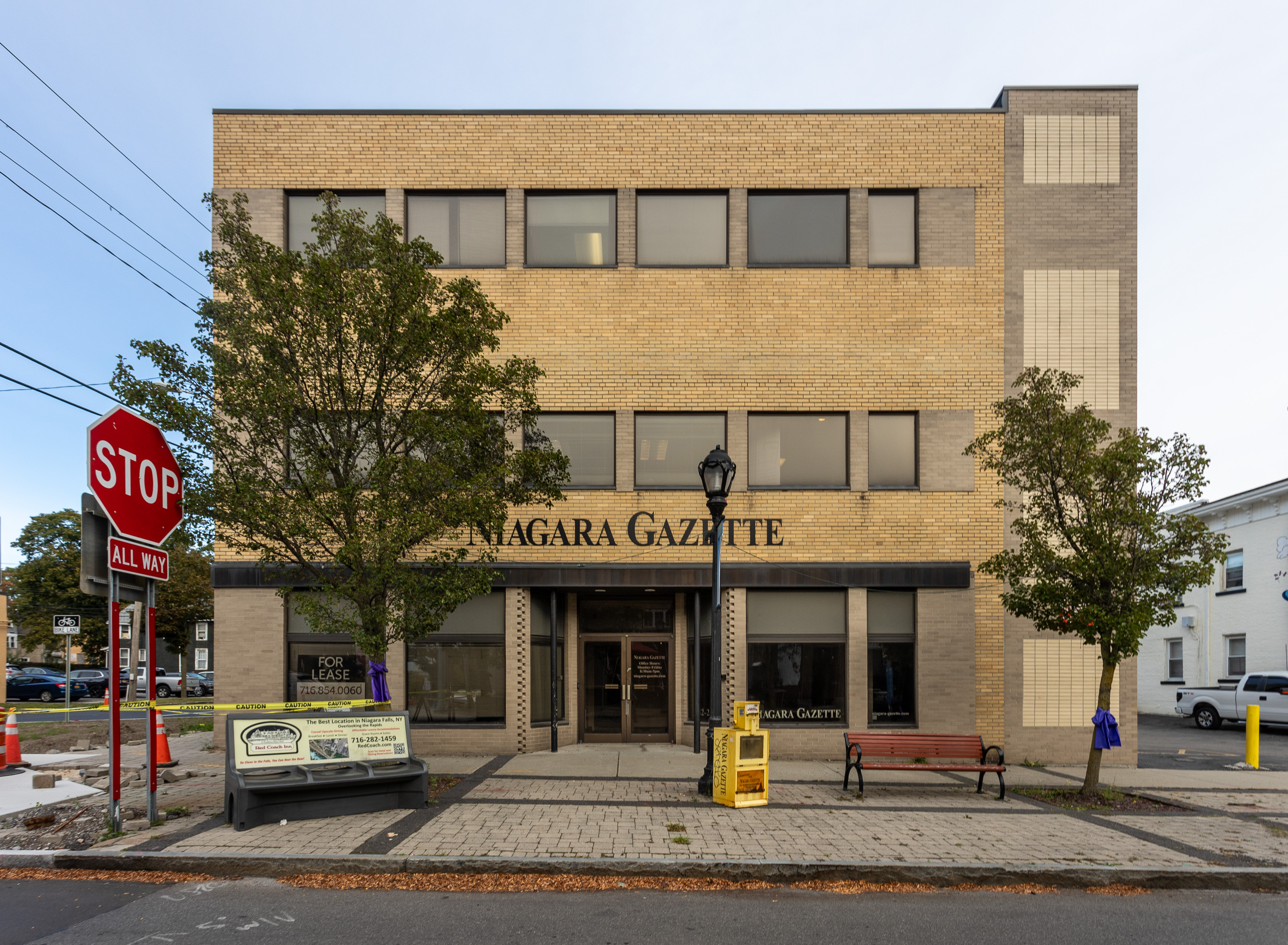
The Niagara Gazette headquarters in Niagara Falls, New York.

The Gazette was founded in 1854 as the Niagara Falls Gazette.

William Pool, son of Thomas F Pool and Fanny Sutherland was "Editor" of the Niagara Falls Gazette according to the 1860 US census and was "Editor and Publisher" in the 1900 US census.

The Gazette was owned by Gannett from 1954 to 1997. Gannett was formed in 1923 by Frank Gannett, a noted conservative, in Rochester, New York as an outgrowth of a newspaper business he had begun in Elmira, New York in 1906.

In a 1996 deal, that closed in 1997, Gannett acquired Buffalo's WGRZ. Due to U.S. Federal Communications Commission regulations, Gannett was required to sell the paper. It was bought by Community Newspaper Holdings Inc., along with other area newspapers such as the Lockport Union-Sun & Journal and the former Tonawanda News.

== See also ==
- The Buffalo News
- Niagara Falls Reporter
