= The Daily Times (Pryor) =

Newspaper

- Type: Daily newspaper
- Format: Broadsheet
- Owner: Community Newspaper Holdings Inc. Iowa
- Publisher: Carolyn Ashford
- Editor: Kathy Parker
- Ceased publication: 2017
- Headquarters: 105 South Adair Street; Pryor, Oklahoma 74361; United States
- Circulation: 3,800 daily
- Website: pryordailytimes.com

The Daily Times was a six-day (Monday through Saturday) daily newspaper published in Pryor, Oklahoma, United States. It was published in the morning on weekdays and Saturdays, by Community Newspaper Holdings Inc.

The newspaper's marketing slogan was "From Your Corner of the World ... to the World in Your Backyard."

On August 29, 2017, The Daily Times published its final edition, under the editorial stewardship of Cydney Baron. The website has been taken down and all inquiries are being forwarded the Claremore Daily Progress, to which Baron was transferred as editor.
