= The Goshen News =

American newspaper in Indiana, founded 1837

- Type: Daily newspaper
- Format: Broadsheet
- Owner: CNHI
- Publisher: Doug McAvoy
- Editor: Sheila Selman
- Founded: 1837 (189 years ago)
- Headquarters: 827 E. Lincoln Ave., Goshen, IN 46528 U.S.
- Circulation: 7,800
- Sister newspapers: Indiana: see list
- Website: www.goshennews.com

The Goshen News is a five-day, Tuesday through Saturday daily newspaper serving Goshen, Indiana, and adjacent portions of Elkhart, Kosciusko, Noble, LaGrange and Marshall Counties in Indiana. The paper publishes Tuesday through Friday with a Saturday Weekend edition. It is owned by CNHI.

== History ==
Goshen's first newspaper was published 187 years ago on January 28, 1837, under the front-page banner of The Goshen Express. In September 1837, Ebenezer Brown founded a second newspaper in Goshen, The Goshen Democrat, which was the forerunner for The Goshen News.

A third Goshen newspaper, The Goshen Times, was established in 1855 by C.W. Stevens and E.W. Metcalf. It consisted of four pages published on Thursdays. An annual subscription cost $2.

The Times later became a primary source of Civil War information for Goshen residents, providing battle reports from colonels and Indiana regiments.

The Goshen Independent was founded in 1875 and was later renamed The Independent, the Goshen Weekly News and finally, in 1896, The Goshen Daily News when it then became a Republican newspaper. The corporate owner of the paper was The News Printing Company, which was formed in 1892.

In 1897, The Goshen Democrat became a daily newspaper, but also maintained a weekly edition for it rural subscribers.

Shortly after the turn of the century, News Printing Company owner George W. Kinnison purchased The Goshen Times and merged it with The Goshen Daily News, creating The Goshen News-Times.

The News-Times and The Goshen Democrat competed against each other for more than 30 years before merging on July 1, 1933, and becoming The Goshen News-Times and Democrat. The name was shortened a few years later to The Goshen News-Democrat.

In 1937, The News-Democrat published a 64-page special section commemorating 100 years of community journalism in Goshen. It included a letter of congratulations from Indiana Gov. M. Clifford Townsend and the president of the United States Franklin D. Roosevelt.

"I congratulate the News-Democrat upon achieving such usefulness to the community that it has completed a full century of publication," Roosevelt wrote. "I should appreciate it if I may, through the medium of the Centennial Edition, extend to all of your readers my hearty felicitations and warmest personal greetings. I trust that the community which your paper has served for so long may continue to enjoy happiness and prosperity as the years come and go."

When Kinnison died in 1954, his majority interest in the News Printing Company was transferred to his nephew, Frank L. "Budd" Hascall, and niece, Jane Hascall Spencer. Frank acquired his sister's stock and took principal ownership. It was that same year that Hascall shortened the name of the paper to The Goshen News, which it has been ever since.

Hascall remained majority owner until his death in 1990, at which time ownership was transferred to his daughter, Jane Hascall Gemmer. In March 1999, the Gemmer family sold the News Printing Company to Gray Communications Systems Inc., out of Atlanta, Ga. Seven years later, in April 2006, NPC and The Goshen News were acquired from Gray by Community Newspaper Holdings Inc. (CNHI) based in Alabama.

Since "Budd" Hascall's death 22 years ago, The Goshen News has had seven publishers: John Gemmer, John Reynolds, Jim Kroemer, Ron Smith, Brian Bloom, Tricia Johnston and Doug McAvoy.
