= Shelbyville Daily Union =

American newspaper in Illinois, founded 1863

- Type: Daily newspaper
- Format: Broadsheet
- Owner: Community Newspaper Holdings Inc.
- Publisher: Darrell Lewis
- Editor: Jeff Long
- Founded: May 9, 1863
- Ceased publication: May 2020 (print), July 2021 (digital)
- Headquarters: 100 West Main Street, Shelbyville, Illinois 62565 United States
- Circulation: 3,305 daily
- Price: USD .50
- Website: shelbyvilledailyunion.com

The Shelbyville Daily Union, "Shelby County's No. 1 News Source," was a daily newspaper serving Shelbyville, Illinois. It was owned by Community Newspaper Holdings Inc.

Missing only two editions since starting as the Shelbyville Weekly Union in 1863, the Union was the county's first daily on January 22, 1887. The Union passed through several local ownership groups before being acquired by Hollinger International in May 1999. That company held on to the Union for a year and a half before selling it to CNHI, which still owns it.

On May 28, 2020, CNHI Effingham, locally represented by publisher Darrell Lewis, announced that they would be switching from print to a digital format. This resulted in the Golden Prairie News, owned by Paddock Publications and Southern Illinois Local Media Group, being the only active weekly newspaper remaining in Shelby County. That changed in July 2020 when the Paddock-owned Shelbyville Eagle was established, making it the second newspaper in Shelby County under Paddock ownership. The day-to-day operations of the Shelbyville Eagle were handled by the Sullivan News Group in Sullivan, Illinois.

As of July 2021, the Daily Union website is no longer populating content, with Shelbyville and Shelby County news permanently established inside the Effingham Daily News.
