= Depth & Current =

- Origin: Seattle, Washington, United States
- Genres: Noise pop, shoegazing
- Years active: 2008-present
- Labels: Hook Echo Music, Club AC30, Nice People, Little Mafia
- Members: Chris Harris; Derek Lemke
- Website: http://www.depthandcurrent.com

Depth & Current is a noise pop, shoegazing band from Seattle, Washington.

== Reviews ==
Depth & Current have released a CD EP, a 7" single, and a full-length CD on Norman, Oklahoma-based independent label Nice People. Their music has been described by Magnet (magazine) as "vast and dynamic as an ocean, characterized by guttural vocals and mesmerizing, spacious psychedelic guitar riffs loaded with distortion". The Norman Transcript called their music "a sound of foreboding doom and forbidden enchantment". The Oklahoma Gazette said that their debut album "sucks and swirls heavy, noisy mixes of grungy guitar and shoegazey vocals into the same dark hinterland where Albini and My Bloody Valentine get plastered and swap dirty jokes".

== Band members ==
- Chris Harris
- Derek Lemke

== Discography ==
=== Albums ===
- Arms EP - Nice People, 2009
- Self-Titled - Nice People, 2011
- "Transient" - Club AC30, March 25, 2013
- "Dysrhythmia" - Nice People, June 24, 2014
- "Believe" - Nice People, February 24, 2015

=== Singles ===
- "Don't Go Away" - Nice People, 2010
- "Make It Home" - Little Mafia, 2013

=== Other appearances ===
- The song "Lost" from their self-titled debut album was featured on the second volume of the 200,000 Gazes Compilation released digitally by the When The Sun Hits Blog in March 2012.
- The song "Someone" from their self-titled debut album was featured on the 2012 Summer Sampler from Virginia Beach-based shoegaze label, Custom Made Music.
