= Washington Times (disambiguation) =

The Washington Times is a current American daily newspaper in Washington D.C. founded in 1982.

Washington Times may also refer to:

- Washington Times Herald (Indiana) (1867–present), an American daily newspaper serving Washington, Indiana, and adjacent portions of Daviess County, Indiana. It is owned by Community Newspaper Holdings Inc.
- The Washington Times (1894–1939) was an American daily newspaper published in Washington, D.C.. It was founded in 1894 and merged with the Washington Herald to create the Washington Times-Herald in 1939.
  - Washington Times-Herald (1939–1954) was an American daily newspaper published in Washington, D.C.
