= Edmond Sun =

Newspaper

- Type: Daily newspaper
- Format: Broadsheet
- Owner: Community Newspaper Holdings Inc.
- Founded: 1889
- Ceased publication: May 6, 2020
- Headquarters: 123 South Broadway, Edmond, Oklahoma 73083 United States
- Circulation: None
- Website: edmondsun.com

The Edmond Sun was a daily newspaper serving the Edmond and Deer Creek communities in Oklahoma, USA. The Edmond Sun was owned by Community Newspaper Holdings Inc.

== History ==
The newspaper was founded in 1889.

On May 6, 2020, The Edmond Sun merged into The Norman Transcript.
