= Cordele Dispatch =

Newspaper published in Cordele, Georgia, US

- Type: Weekly newspaper
- Format: Broadsheet
- Owner: Carpenter Media Group
- Publisher: Frank Perea
- Managing editor: Frank Perea
- Founded: 1908
- Headquarters: 306 West 13th Avenue; Cordele, Georgia 31015; United States
- Circulation: 3,369 (as of 2013)
- Website: cordeledispatch.com

The Cordele Dispatch is a weekly newspaper published in Cordele, Georgia. It is owned by Carpenter Media Group.

== History ==
In April 1908, the first issue of the Cordele Sunday Dispatch was published by Judge J. B. Smith and Alvin Roberts. The paper advocated for social reforms such as increased railroad regulation and agricultural diversification, but also the conservative Democratic plank of Black voter disenfranchisement. Smith and Roberts sold the paper only half a year later, and the Sunday Dispatch cycled through several owners, publication days, and frequencies for the next several years.

Former Cordele solicitor general and future mayor Judge Max E. Land purchased the Dispatch in 1914 and used it to argue against the Solid South political control by Democrats. In 1916, Land formed the Dispatch Publishing Company and put Charles E. Brown in charge as editor. Brown changed the paper to a daily, and in 1926 absorbed the Cordele Daily Sentinel, re-titling the new paper the Cordele Dispatch and Daily Sentinel. The name was changed to the present Cordele Dispatch in 1926. Brown died in 1930 and his widow Florence E. Brown managed the paper until 1938, when she sold it to John W. Greer, Jr.

In August 2015, Community Newspaper Holdings, Inc. sold the Dispatch to Carpenter Newsmedia LLC, since renamed to Carpenter Media Group.
