= The Journal-Register =

- Type: Daily newspaper
- Format: Broadsheet
- Owner: Community Newspaper Holdings Inc.
- Publisher: Robert E. Waters, Publisher Emeritus
- Editor: Alonzo L. Waters, Editor-Publisher 1919-1980
- Founded: 1821
- Ceased publication: May 30, 2014
- Headquarters: 409-413 Main St., Medina, NY 14103
- Circulation: 1,500 daily in 2014
- Price: USD .50 daily

The Journal-Register existed in various incarnations for more than 100 years as the community newspaper of Medina, New York, United States. As a daily newspaper, and later as a three-day (Monday, Wednesday, Friday) evening publication, the publication covered several towns and villages of Orleans County.

Alonzo L. Waters (editor-publisher 1919-1980) joined the Medina Daily Journal (founded 1903) shortly after college and became a full-time staff writer following World War I. He and business partner W. John Hinchey developed the daily publication, which had been founded by David Benson and William Baker. They saw it through the Great Depression and in the early 1930s installed the first newspaper printing press in the county to print from a continuous roll (web). Waters acquired full ownership in the 1940s and in 1949 was joined by his son, Robert E. Waters. Robert took the helm in 1980 after the death of his father, and the paper continued year-over-year growth.

The Daily Journal (1903) and the Medina Register merged to become The Medina Daily Journal-Register in 1970, and investments in new technologies followed including an investment of more than $150,000 in a new bank of Goss Printing Presses and fully computerized typesetting systems. The paper became a Western New York leader in that respect. The investments led to growth in both employment and reader base. Even as it modernized, the newspaper maintained a family feel among employees and readers.

During this time, Waters acquired the Albion Weekly Advertiser, Medina Penny Saver and incorporated a TV guide booklet. These publications with The Journal-Register formed a group called Lake Plains Publications.

In 1984, Robert E. Waters sold all assets of The Medina Daily-Journal Register, Inc., and its subsidiary the Albion Advertiser, to the Roy H. Park Newspaper Group, headquartered in Ithaca, New York. Shareholders at the time of the sale included Robert E. Waters, Barbara B. Waters, and Lewis H. Waters.

It was later owned by Greater Niagara Newspapers, a division of Community Newspaper Holdings Inc.

The final print issue of The Journal-Register was published on May 30, 2014.
