= NewsPress =

Coordinates: 36.11201°N 97.06051°W

Stillwater News Press
- Type: Daily newspaper
- Format: Broadsheet
- Owner: CNHI
- Editor: Beau Simmons
- General manager: Katie Bean
- Headquarters: 502 S Duck Street; Stillwater, Oklahoma 74074; United States
- Circulation: 2500 Daily; 2500 Sunday (as of 2025)
- Website: stwnewspress.com

The Stillwater News Press is a newspaper published in Stillwater, Oklahoma, United States. It is owned by CNHI. As of May 2026, it changed to print editions on Tuesday, Thursday and weekend editions on Saturday with e-editions on corresponding days.

In addition to Stillwater, the News Press covers the Payne County communities of Cushing, Glencoe, Perkins, Ripley and Yale; the Noble County communities of Morrison and Perry; Pawnee in Pawnee County; and Coyle in Logan County.
