= Gainesville Daily Register =

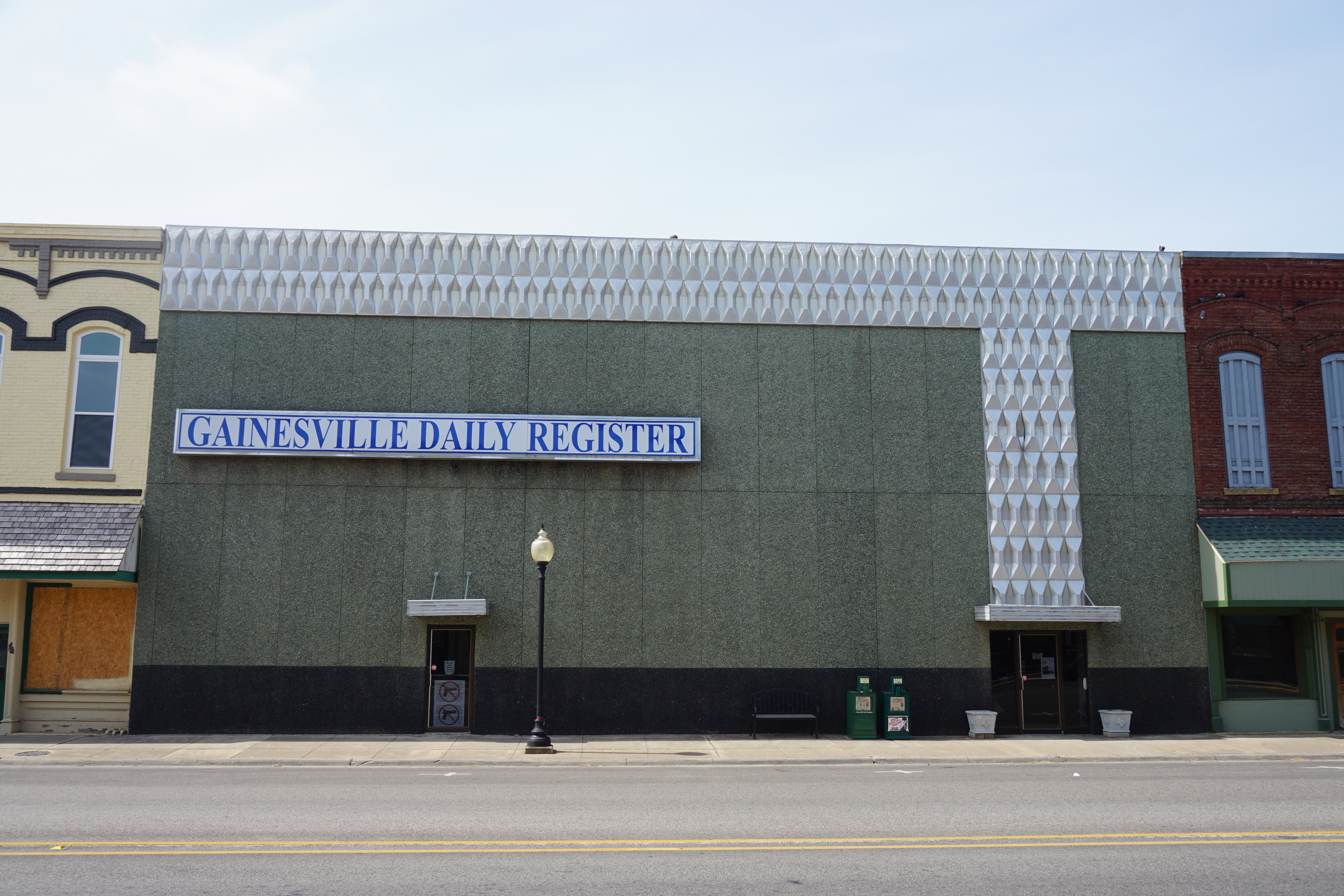
- Gainesville Daily Register building
- Type: Daily newspaper
- Format: Broadsheet
- Owner(s): Community Newspaper Holdings Inc.
- Publisher: Lisa Chappell
- Editor: Mike Eads
- Founded: 1890
- Headquarters: 306 E. California St. Gainesville, Texas 76241; United States
- Circulation: 1,108 (as of 2023)
- Website: gainesvilleregister.com

The Gainesville Daily Register is newspaper published in Gainesville, Texas, on Tuesdays and Fridays. It has been published continuously since 1890.

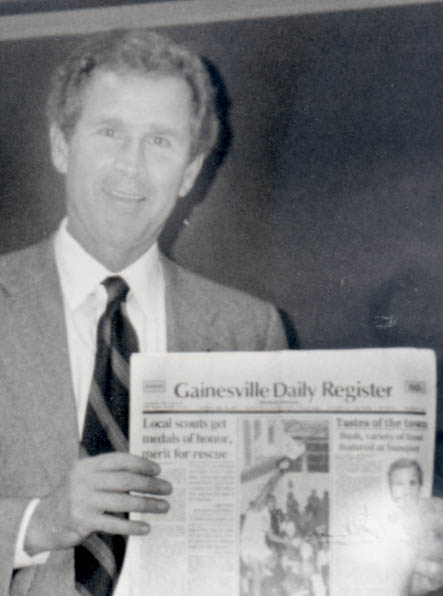
Texas Gov. George W. Bush holds a copy of the Gainesville Daily Register during a visit to Gainesville, Texas, circa 1998.

The newspaper covers primarily Cooke County, Texas, and parts of Love County, Oklahoma to the north, Montague County, Texas to the west, and Grayson County, Texas to the east. It is owned by Community Newspaper Holdings Inc (CNHI), and is the only daily newspaper operating in Cooke County.

The newspaper, formerly known as Gainesville Daily Register and Messenger, was founded by the Leonard family of Gainesville in 1890. The newspaper was sold to Donrey Media in 1973. Shortly thereafter the newspaper converted to offset printing and a new six-unit Goss printing press was set up. CNHI acquired the paper in 1998. The publication is printed at Texoma Web Offset Printing in Gainesville, Texas.
