= The Valdosta Daily Times =

- Front page of The Valdosta Daily Times from 1905
- Type: Daily newspaper
- Format: Broadsheet
- Owner: Carpenter Media Group
- Publisher: Laurie Gay
- Editor: Kevin Hall
- Founded: 1867
- Headquarters: 201 North Troup Street; Valdosta, Georgia 31601; United States
- Circulation: 13,600 (as of 2013)
- Sister newspapers: The Moultrie Observer, The Tifton Gazette, The Thomasville Times Enterprise
- Website: valdostadailytimes.com

The Valdosta Daily Times is a daily newspaper published in Valdosta, Georgia, United States. It is owned by Carpenter Media Group.

== History ==
The Valdosta Daily Times was established in 1867. Community Newspaper Holdings acquired the newspaper in 2000 from Thomson. The company sold the paper in May 2024 to Carpenter Media Group. In October 2024, the paper's office building was put up for sale.

Beginning December 2, 2024, the print edition was reduced to three days per week (Tuesday, Thursday and Saturday) from the previous four days per week schedule.
