= Corsicana Daily Sun =

Newspaper in Texas, United States

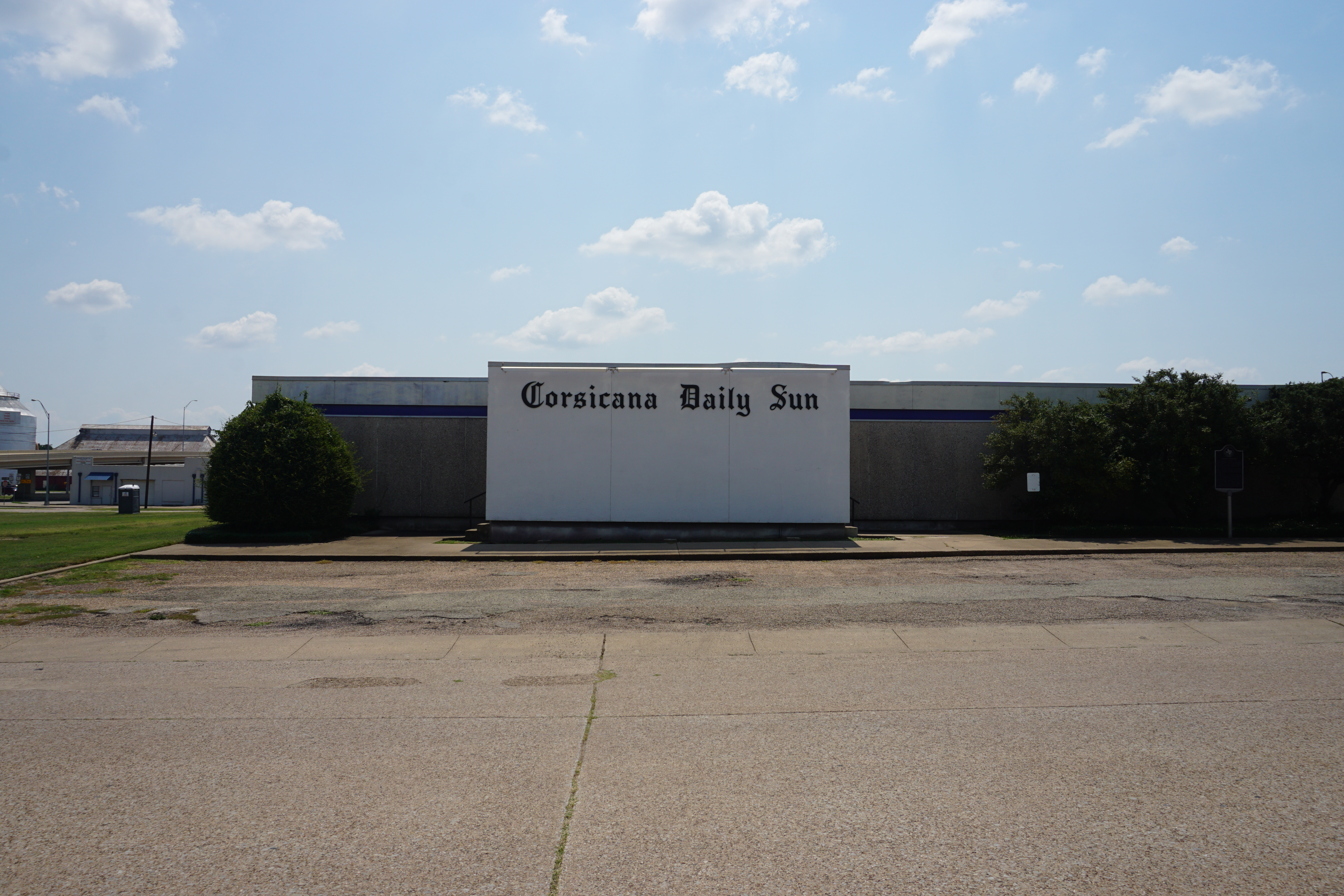
- The Corsicana Daily Sun building
- Type: Daily newspaper
- Format: Broadsheet
- Owner: Community Newspaper Holdings Inc.
- Publisher: Lange Svehlak
- Editor: Guy Chapman
- Founded: 1895
- Headquarters: 405 East Collin Street Corsicana, Texas 75110; United States
- Circulation: 1,606 (as of 2023)
- ISSN: 8750-2518
- Website: corsicanadailysun.com

The Corsicana Daily Sun is a morning daily newspaper published in Corsicana, Texas, covering Navarro County. It is now published two days a week (Tuesday and Saturday). It is owned by Community Newspaper Holdings Inc.

The Daily Sun first published on March 2, 1895.

In June 2023, Guy Chapman took over as the Corsicana Daily Sun editor. In November 2023, Lange Svehlak became the Daily Sun's new publisher.
