= Pauls Valley Democrat =

Newspaper in Pauls Valley, Oklahoma

- Type: Tri-weekly newspaper
- Format: Broadsheet
- Owner: Community Newspaper Holdings Inc.
- Editor: Mike Arie
- Founded: 1904
- Headquarters: 108 South Willow Street; Pauls Valley, Oklahoma 73075, United States
- Circulation: 3,059 daily
- Website: paulsvalleydailydemocrat.com

The Pauls Valley Democrat is a tri-weekly newspaper published in Pauls Valley, Oklahoma, United States, covering Pauls Valley and other communities in Garvin County. It is owned by Community Newspaper Holdings Inc.

In May 2011, the paper adopted its current name after reducing its frequency to three issues a week. It was previously called the Pauls Valley Daily Democrat and published five editions per week.
