= The Meridian Star =

Newspaper published in Meridian, Mississippi

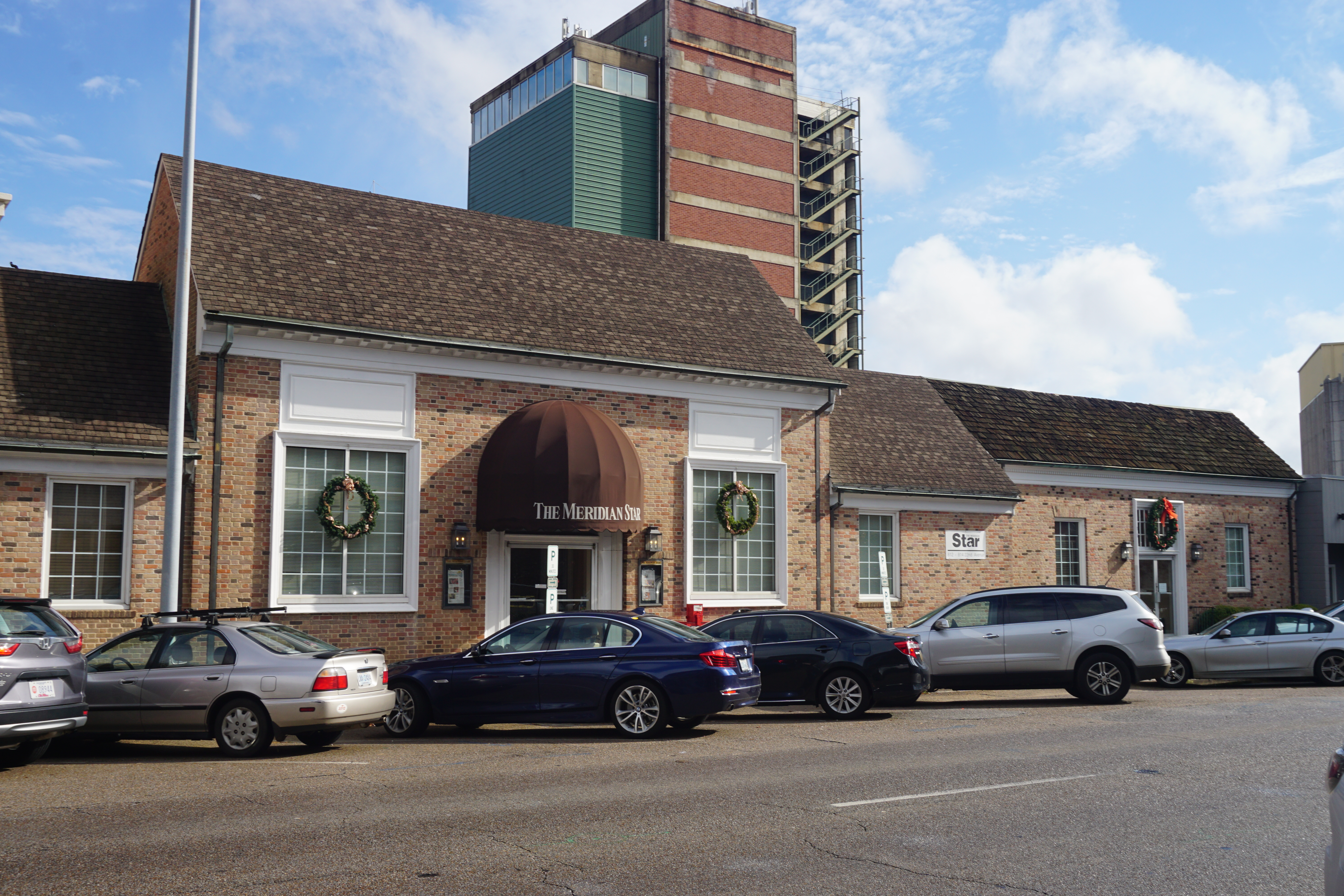
- Meridian Star Headquarters
- Type: Triweekly (formerly a daily newspaper)
- Format: Broadsheet
- Owner: Carpenter Media Group
- Founder(s): Charles Pinckney Dement and James Washington Dement
- Publisher: Bill Atkinson
- Editor: David Bohrer
- Founded: 1898, as The Evening Star
- Headquarters: 814 22nd Avenue; Meridian, Mississippi 39302; United States
- Circulation: 16,188 daily (as of 2007)
- ISSN: 1064-9549
- OCLC number: 10362622
- Website: meridianstar.com

The Meridian Star is a newspaper published in Meridian, Mississippi. Formerly a daily newspaper, it switched to a triweekly format in 2020, publishing on Tuesday, Thursday, and Saturday mornings. The paper covers Lauderdale County and adjoining portions of western Alabama and eastern Mississippi.

== History ==
Founded as The Evening Star in 1898 by Charles Pinckney Dement and his son James Washington Dement, the paper was published each afternoon until early 2005, when morning delivery was implemented. The paper was renamed The Meridian Star in 1915 and has been Meridian's only daily newspaper since 1921.

In May 2024, CNHI sold the newspaper to Carpenter Media Group.

== Notable staff ==
Jack Wardlaw, the Baton Rouge bureau chief of the New Orleans Times-Picayune, began his journalism career at The Star in 1959 as a city hall reporter.

== Price ==
According to the masthead, the price for a single copy is $1.50 for all print editions.
