= Kokomo Tribune =

American newspaper Indiana, founded 1850

- "Positively, Part of Your Life"
- Type: Daily newspaper
- Format: Broadsheet
- Owner: CNHI
- Publisher: Robyn McCloskey
- Editor: Kimberly King
- Founded: October 30, 1850 (175 years ago)
- Headquarters: 123 N. Buckeye, Kokomo, Indiana 46901 USA
- Circulation: 21,908 (as of 2006)
- Sister newspapers: Indiana: see list
- Website: www.kokomotribune.com

The Kokomo Tribune is a daily newspaper based in Kokomo, Indiana, United States. It is owned by CNHI.

== History ==
The Kokomo Tribune can trace its history back to October 1850, when the weekly Howard Tribune was founded in Kokomo to cover Howard County, Indiana. T.C. Philips (owner, 1856–1878) was credited with raising the paper's quality and rebuilding it after an 1862 tornado. Between 1897 and 1981, the paper was among the state's most influential under ownership by the Kautz-Blacklidge family until, at the direction of the partners/owners, then-publisher Kent Blacklidge sold it to Thomson Corporation. In 2000, Thomson sold the Kokomo Tribune to CNHI, which owns several other Indiana newspapers.

The Kokomo Tribune was cited by the Audit Bureau of Circulation for the nation's highest market penetration for eight years in the 1970s; honored with the state's Century Business Award in 1994; and a 2006 Suburban Newspaper Association award for "best online initiative", recognizing the newspaper's online video, audio and audio slide shows.

In 1989, The Kokomo Perspective began publishing in Kokomo as a weekly competitor to the Tribune. It ceased publication in late 2021.

== In Media ==
- Season 1, Episode 2 of the documentary television show Neighbors aired in February 2026, featuring a dispute between neighbors Darrell and Trever that takes place in Kokomo. The episode also features an interview with Tribune journalist Tyler Juranovich and an article he authored about the zoning dispute which appeared on the front page of the newspaper. Another front-page headline and article, authored by journalist Kelly Lafferty Gerber, also appears in the episode.
