= The Daily Citizen (Dalton, Georgia) =

Newspaper in Dalton, Georgia

- Type: Daily newspaper
- Format: Broadsheet
- Owner: Carpenter Media Group
- Editor: Jessica Waters
- Founded: 1847
- Headquarters: 610 South Glenwood Avenue; Dalton, Georgia 30721; United States
- Circulation: 10,294 (as of 2013)
- Website: daltoncitizen.com

The Daily Citizen is a daily newspaper published in Dalton, Georgia. It is owned by Carpenter Media Group.

== History ==
The newspaper was founded in 1847 as The North Georgia Citizen.

In May 2024, CNHI sold the newspaper to Carpenter Media Group.

== Other publications ==
Besides The Daily Citizen, the newspaper group publishes the monthly Dalton Magazine, Calhoun Magazine, Catoosa Life Magazine, Health, Mind & Body magazine and a Spanish-language weekly newspaper, El Informador, all of which are distributed in and around Dalton, and other publications in Georgia and Tennessee.
