= Commonwealth Journal =

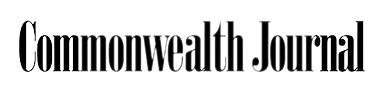

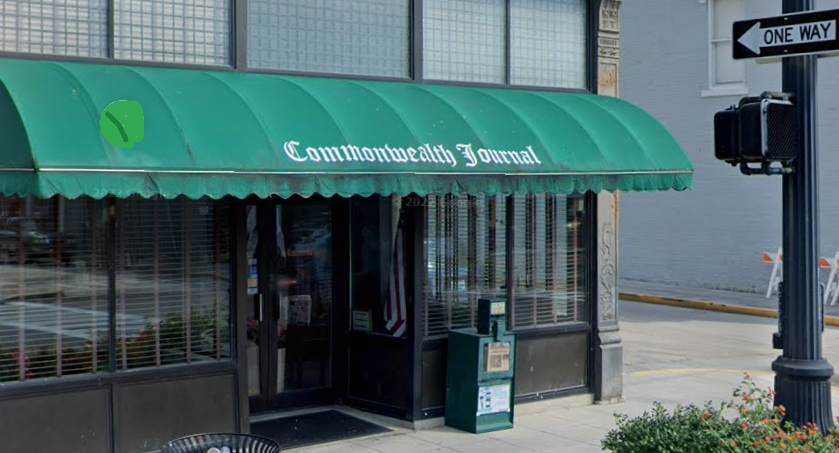
- Type: Daily newspaper
- Format: Broadsheet
- Owner(s): Community Newspaper Holdings Inc.
- Publisher: Mark Walker
- Editor: Steve Cornelius
- Founded: 1895
- Headquarters: 110-112 East Mount Vernon Street; Somerset, Kentucky 42501; United States
- Circulation: 8,971 daily
- Website: somerset-kentucky.com

The Commonwealth Journal is a four-day (Tuesday, Wednesday, Friday, and Saturday) morning daily newspaper based in Somerset, Kentucky, and covering Pulaski County. It is owned by Community Newspaper Holdings Inc. The editorial staff are listed; Jeff Neal, editor; Steve Cornelius, sports editor; Chris Harris, Janie Slaven, Carla Slavey, Caleb Lowndes, and Bill Mardis.

Founded separately as the Somerset Journal (1895) and The Commonwealth (1912), Somerset's two weekly newspapers began sharing office space and presses in the 1930s, eventually merging to become the Monday-Friday daily Commonwealth Journal January 3, 1966. The local owners added a Sunday edition October 31, 1982, before selling the paper to Park Newspapers on May 1, 1988. Park in turn sold the Commonwealth Journal in February 1997 to Media General, which dealt it to CNHI a year later.
