= Jacksonville Progress =

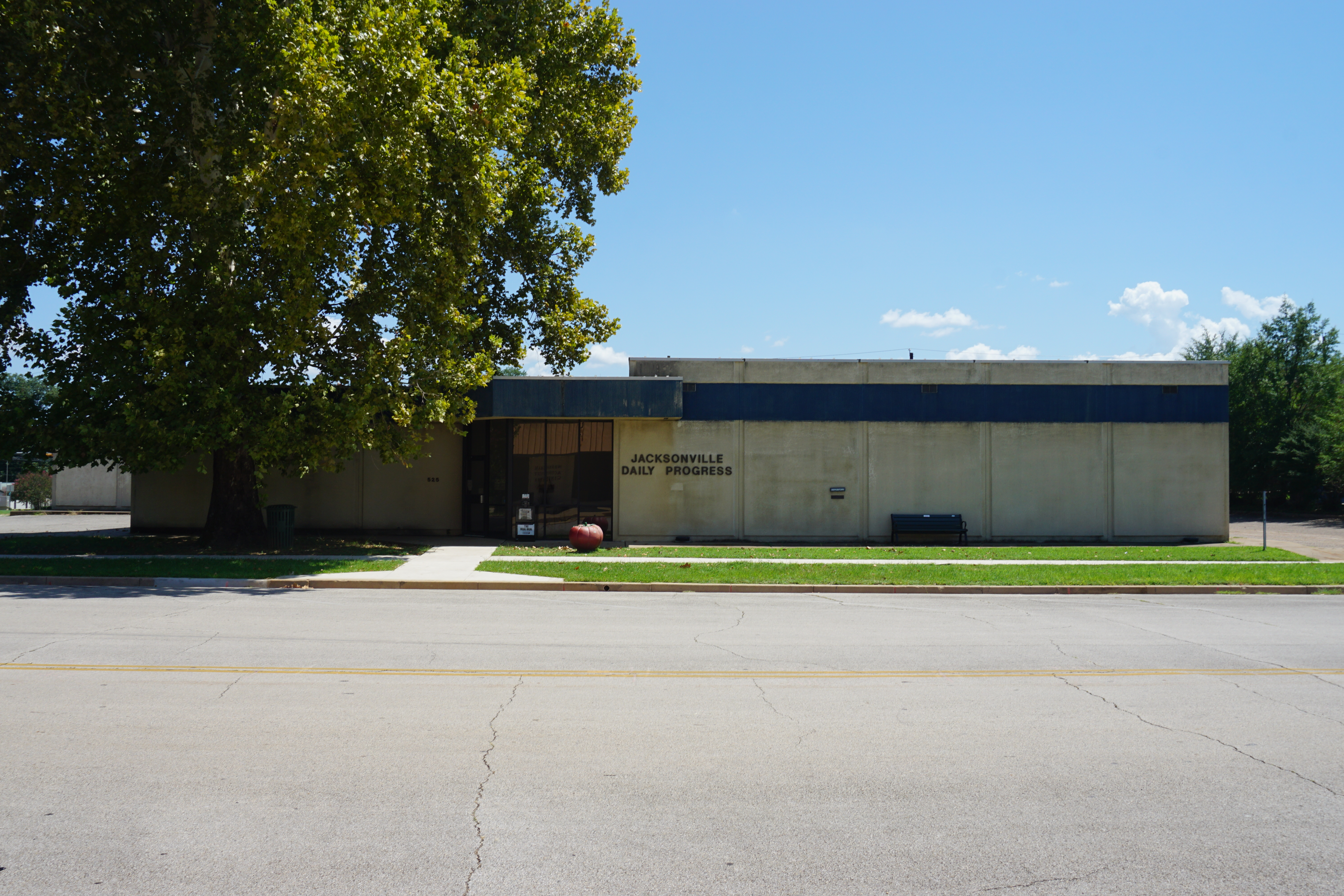
- Jacksonville Progress building, on the east side of downtown Jacksonville
- Type: Newspaper
- Format: Broadsheet
- Owner(s): Community Newspaper Holdings Inc.
- Publisher: Jake Mienk
- Editor: Michael Kormos
- Founded: 1910
- Headquarters: 525 East Commerce Street; Jacksonville, Texas 75766; United States
- Circulation: 1,067 (as of 2023)
- Website: jacksonvilleprogress.com

The Jacksonville Progress is a three times a week newspaper published in Jacksonville, Texas, on Tuesday, Thursday and Saturday mornings. It is owned by Community Newspaper Holdings Inc.
