= The Daily Item (Sunbury) =

Daily newspaper covering the Central Susquehanna Valley, Pennsylvania, US

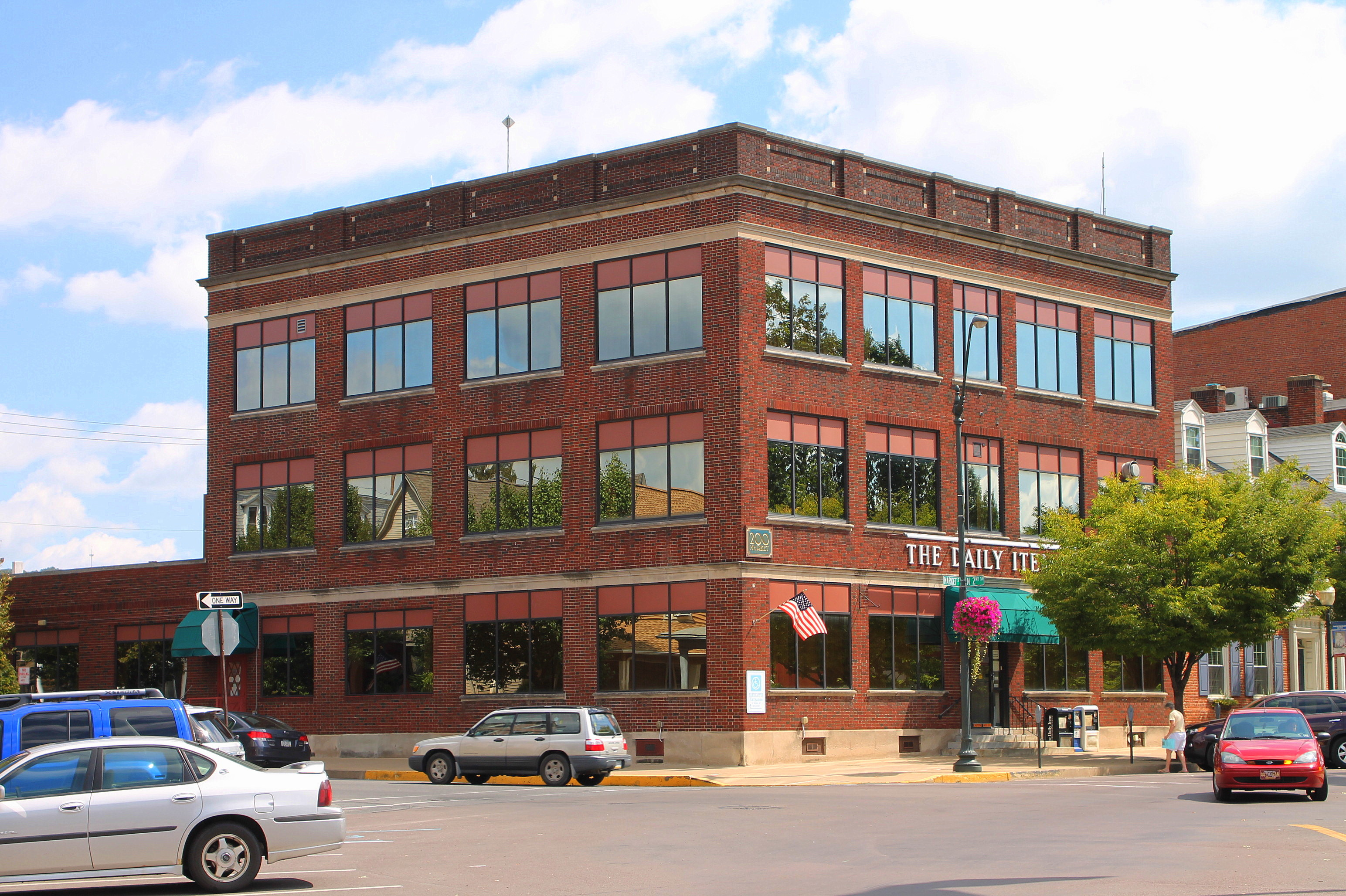
- Daily Item headquarters in Sunbury
- Type: Daily newspaper
- Format: Broadsheet
- Owner(s): CNHI, LLC
- Publisher: Charles (Chip) Minemyer
- Editor: William Bowman
- Founded: 1872 (as The Sunbury Daily)
- Language: English
- Headquarters: 200 Market Street, Sunbury, Pennsylvania 17801 U.S.
- Circulation: Approx 10,500 Weekdays, 12,500 Sunday
- Price: $2.00 Daily $3.50 Sunday
- Website: dailyitem.com

The Daily Item is a daily newspaper in Sunbury, Pennsylvania, covering the Central Susquehanna Valley Region. It is owned by Community Newspaper Holdings Inc.

== History ==
The Sunbury Daily (founded 1872) and The Evening Item (1893) merged July 1, 1936. Publishing five afternoons per week, The Daily Item was owned by the Dewart family and other local investors until April 15, 1970, when Ottaway Community Newspapers purchased it. Ottaway streamlined and upgraded the newspaper. It built new presses in 1979 and introduced Saturday and Sunday morning editions in the late 1980s. In 2001, the paper bought The Danville News.

Community Newspaper Holdings bought The Daily Item and The Danville News in late 2006 from Ottaway Community Newspapers, a division of Dow Jones & Company.

In May 2015, the newspaper published a letter to the editor calling for the execution of US President Barack Obama. The newspaper later apologized.
