= The Meadville Tribune =

Daily newspaper in Pennsylvania, US

- Type: Daily newspaper
- Format: Broadsheet
- Owner: Community Newspaper Holdings Inc.
- Publisher: Sharon Sorg
- Editor: Rick Green
- Founded: 1884
- Headquarters: 947 Federal Court, Meadville, Pennsylvania 16335 United States
- Circulation: 14,128 daily
- Price: USD .50 daily
- Website: meadvilletribune.com

The Meadville Tribune is a five-day morning newspaper published in Meadville, Pennsylvania, covering Crawford County. It is owned by CNHI.
