= The Moultrie Observer =

- Type: Weekly newspaper
- Format: Broadsheet
- Owner: Carpenter Media Group
- Publisher: Laurie Gay
- Editor: Kevin C. Hall
- Founded: 1894
- Headquarters: 25 North Main Street, Moultrie, Georgia 31768 USA
- Circulation: 4,795 (as of 2013)
- Website: moultrieobserver.com

The Moultrie Observer is a weekly newspaper published in Moultrie, Georgia. The paper is distributed on Wednesdays and is owned by Carpenter Media Group.

== History ==
The Moultrie Observer was first published in 1894. Gannett acquired the paper with its acquisition of Multimedia in 1995. Thomson acquired the paper from Gannett in 1997 and sold it to Community Newspaper Holdings, Inc. in 2000. The paper was sold again in May 2024 to Carpenter Media Group.
