= The Ada News =

Newspaper in Oklahoma, United States

- Type: Bi-weekly newspaper
- Format: Broadsheet
- Owner: Community Newspaper Holdings Inc.
- Publisher: Maurisa Nelson
- Editor: Charlene Belew- Editor Richard Barron- News Editor
- Founded: 1904
- Headquarters: 119 N Broadway, Suite 11, Ada, Oklahoma 74820 USA
- Circulation: 3,000 Daily
- Website: theadanews.com

The Ada News is a bi-weekly published two days a week in Ada, Oklahoma. The publication's coverage area includes Pontotoc County and portions of Coal County, Garvin County, Hughes County, Johnston County, Murray County and Seminole County. The newspaper is published Wednesday and Saturday.

== History ==
The newspaper began publication on March 14, 1904. Beginning May 26, 1968, a Sunday edition was added. The newspaper was published by Carlton Weaver & Company at one time. The name of the paper was changed to The Ada News in summer 2012.

The Thomson Corporation sold The Ada News, along with 11 other papers, to the American Publishing Company (later Hollinger International) in 1995. Hollinger sold off most of its small papers in 1999, and The Ada News went to Community Newspaper Holdings, a company founded in 1997 by Ralph Martin.

Maurisa Nelson was appointed general manager of The Ada News on Oct. 21, 2019, after many years as a marketing consultant and advertising director for the newspaper. She was promoted to publisher in 2021.

In November 2024, the newspaper announced it will cease its Wednesday and Friday e-editions.
