= The Duncan Banner =

American newspaper in Oklahoma, founded 1892

Duncan Banner
- Type: Daily newspaper
- Format: Broadsheet
- Owner(s): CNHI
- Founded: 1892
- Headquarters: 811 West Main Street; Duncan, Oklahoma 73534; United States
- Circulation: 5,000
- Website: duncanbanner.com

The Duncan Banner "Stephens County's Only Daily Newspaper", is a three-day-a-week newspaper published in Duncan, Oklahoma, United States. Founded by James P. Sampson in 1892, The Duncan Banner is the oldest business in Duncan still operating under the same name. Its first presses were reportedly brought to Duncan on the first railroad train to stop there. The newspaper is owned by CNHI. As of 2009, the newspaper was published in the morning on Tuesday, Thursday and Saturday and had a circulation of 5,000.
