= Commercial-News =

American newspaper in Illinois, founded 1866

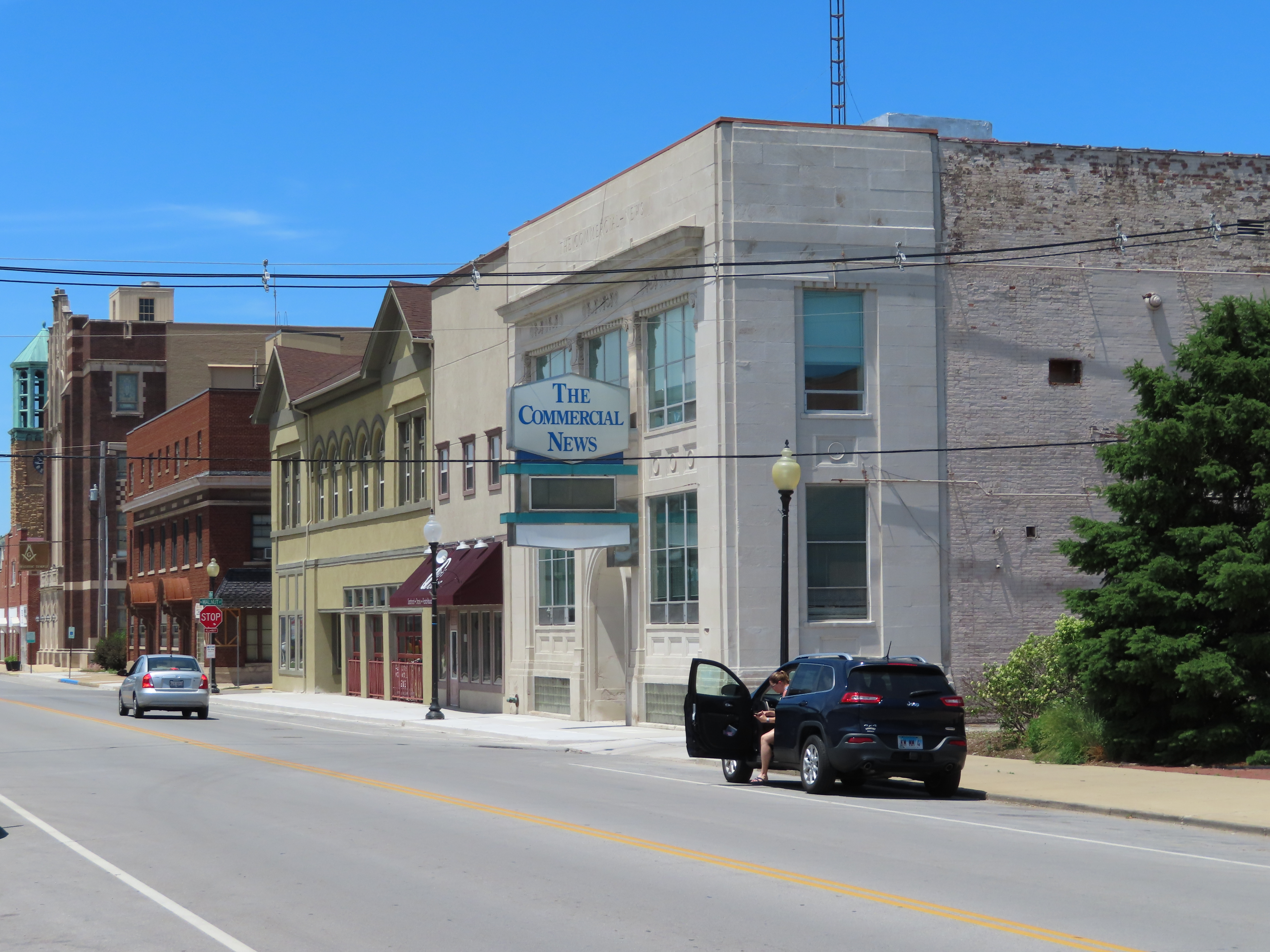
- Commercial News building
- Type: Daily newspaper
- Format: Broadsheet
- Owner: CNHI
- Publisher: Amy Winter
- Editor: Amy Graham-McCarty
- Founded: 1866 (159 years ago)
- Language: English
- Headquarters: 2 E. Main St., Unit 28., Danville, Illinois 61832 USA
- Circulation: 285
- Website: www.commercial-news.com

The Commercial-News is a community newspaper that serves Danville, Illinois and surrounding communities. It is owned by CNHI, who acquired it from Gannett in 1998. It maintains a presence as a three-day print, and also an online publication.

It was founded, as the Danville Commercial, in 1866. In 1903 it merged with the rival Danville Express, itself founded in 1873, to become the Danville Commercial-News, later shortened to its current name.
