= Tahlequah Daily Press =

Newspaper in Tahlequah, Oklahoma

- Type: Daily newspaper
- Format: Broadsheet
- Owner: CNHI
- Publisher: Heather Kilpatrick
- Editor: Kim Poindexter
- Founded: 1963, as The Pictorial Press
- Headquarters: 106 West Second Street; Tahlequah, Oklahoma 74464, United States
- Circulation: 5,688 daily
- Website: tahlequahdailypress.com

The Tahlequah Daily Press is a daily newspaper published in Tahlequah, Oklahoma, United States. It is owned by CNHI, LLC.

== History ==
Originally published as The Pictorial Press from 1964-1978 this newspaper was founded by Clyde D. Cain and wife Margaret B. Cain, in August 1963. Page layout began on the family dining room table at Big Hollow, 8 miles south of Tahlequah in Cherokee County, Oklahoma.

As the paper grew, operating space became limited. Cain rented a building on State Street in Tahlequah in 1964 to accommodate production requirements. At that time, Cain also hired Ted Risenhoover and his wife Carol as employees of the paper.

Cain was said to always be looking for new adventures and quickly tired of the newspaper business, selling the publication to Risenhoover in 1965. Risenhoover owned the paper for a number of years before selling it. Eventually, the newspaper absorbed the Tahlequah Star and the Cherokee County Chronicle, thus linking itself to newspapers that had been around well before the turn of the 20th century.
