= The Union-Recorder =

- Type: Daily newspaper
- Format: Broadsheet
- Owner: Carpenter Media Group
- Publisher: Frank Perea
- Editor: Natalie Davis Linder
- Founded: 1820
- Headquarters: 165 Garrett Way, Milledgeville, Georgia 31061 United States
- Circulation: 6,937 daily (as of 2007)
- Website: www.unionrecorder.com

The Union-Recorder is a daily newspaper in Milledgeville, Georgia. It is Georgia’s oldest continuously published newspaper, and owned by Carpenter Media Group.

== History ==
The Union-Recorder, was established as a result of the 1872 consolidation of two other Milledgeville papers, the Federal Union (established in 1830) and the Southern Recorder (established in 1820).

=== 1820: Southern Recorder ===
Milledgeville had several previous publications, including the Milledgeville Intelligencer, the first edition of which was published in July 1806 under the editorship of Alexander McMillian. In years to follow, the Argus, the Republican, the Reflector and the Georgia Journal began publishing in Milledgeville between 1806 and 1820. Only the Georgia Journal was still appearing, however, on February 15, 1820, when Seaton Grantland, one of its former editors and a native of Virginia, who had honed his journalistic skills at the famous Richmond Enquirer, and Richard M. Orme brought out the first issue of the Southern Recorder.

The paper leaned politically toward the state's rights doctrine and became an extremely successful publication in the state capital. The Southern Recorder supported the Troup Faction and Whig Party throughout the antebellum period. In their first issue, the two editors promised to practice fearless, independent journalism, and immediately proceeded to live up to that promise by meeting head-on the controversial question of whether Missouri should be admitted to the Union as a slave or a free state.

In its second issue, the Southern Recorder assumed a responsibility it would honor throughout its long life — its obligation to promote the welfare of its community. The editors pointed out with pride to the stability of real estate prices in Milledgeville in contrast to the depressed values elsewhere in the state.

Editorial opposition to the Southern Recorder came with the founding of the Milledgeville Georgia Patriot, which debuted November 5, 1822. The opposition became more aggressive in 1826 when the Patriot merged with the Milledgeville Statesman. Readership was active at all three: In the 1828 edition of Sherwood’s Gazeteer, the editor estimated that between 7,000 and 8,000 copies of the three Milledgeville papers were printed each week. The town had become the journalistic as well as the political capital of the state.

=== 1830: Federal Union & Editorial Warfare ===
In response to the strongly Troup and Whig-oriented Southern Recorder, Tomlinson Fort, a prominent Milledgeville physician and future mayor of the city, established the Federal Union in 1830, setting off a 40-year editorial war with the Southern Recorder that would not cease until the two papers merged in 1872. The paper's political leanings viewed unionism over state's rights and would support the Clark Faction and Democratic Party. Competition between the papers was fierce, even to the point of physical confrontation between the editors.

=== Civil War & Rivals United ===
By the late 1850s, Milledgeville's newspapers supported the idea of state's rights, but stopped short of calls for secession. The Southern Recorder published articles suggesting that compromise was possible and preferable. Once Georgia and the rest of the South seceded, however, the papers aligned themselves firmly behind the Confederacy. The Federal Union, in January of 1861, removed the American flag from its banner and changed its name to the Southern Federal Union, and would in the following year change its name again to the Confederate Union, a name that would only last until the end of the war.

The war forced a shortage of both funds and material for the Federal Union and the Southern Recorder. The problem became so significant by 1864, both newspapers were forced to reduce their weekly issues from four pages to two. In November of that year, General William T. Sherman and his forces marched through Milledgeville during his infamous March to the Sea, forcing the Federal Union to conceal its printing equipment in the forest to prevent its destruction. In 1872, A. J. Orme, Richard Orme's son, sold the Southern Recorder to the Federal Union which resulted in their merger and the creation of the Union and Recorder.

=== Post-Merger & Modern Day ===
Following the merger, the Democratic Union and Recorder was delivered every Wednesday and could be purchased at two dollars per year; the editor was S. N. Boughton and the publishers were Boughton, and Barnes & Moore. The paper adopted its contemporary name, The Union-Recorder, in 1886. The Union-Recorder continued to prosper during the remainder of the nineteenth and throughout the twentieth century, and today serves as a primary source of news and the legal organ for the city of Milledgeville and Baldwin County.

Today, The Union-Recorder is published two days a week, Wednesday and Saturday by Milledgeville Newsmedia, LLC. The Union-Recorder is a two-time recipient of the prestigious Sutlive trophy for Outstanding Community Service, as well as numerous writing honors given by the Georgia Press Association and the Georgia Associated Press Association.

== Ownership ==
Community Newspaper Holdings Inc. purchased the newspaper from Knight Ridder in 1997. The company sold the paper in May 2024 to Carpenter Media Group.
