= Cleburne Times-Review =

Newspaper published in Texas, US

- Type: Daily newspaper
- Format: Broadsheet
- Owner(s): Community Newspaper Holdings Inc.
- Publisher: Lisa Chappell
- Editor: Monica Faram
- Founded: 1904
- Headquarters: 108 South Anglin Street; Cleburne, Texas 76031; United States
- Circulation: 1,329 (as of 2023)
- Website: http://www.cleburnetimesreview.com

The Cleburne Times-Review is a six-day daily newspaper published in Cleburne, Texas, in the morning on weekdays (Monday through Saturday). It covers "all of Johnson County". It is owned by Community Newspaper Holdings Inc.

== History ==
The newspaper was owned by Waco-based Newspapers Inc. in the 1930s. William M. Rawland, who worked at the newspaper as its bookkeeper, purchased the newspaper with his father-in-law in July 1940. He continued to own and published the Cleburne Times-Review through the 1970s. Rawland bought out Walter Murray in July 1947, becoming the sole owner. His official title was publisher and general manager.

In 1976, he sold the newspaper to Donrey Media Group. The transition seemed to be relatively smooth since Rawland's nephew, Paul I. Griffith, was appointed as general manager. Griffith joined the newspaper in 1945 as its advertising manager. Rawland continued to have an office at the newspaper. He was named publisher emeritus and served as an assistant to Don W. Reynolds. Griffith retired in 1995, leaving Bill Rice as general manager. Like Griffith, Rice had been advertising manager at the newspaper.

Donrey Media Group sold the newspaper to CNHI in July 1998. A former employee, Bob Sonderegger, wrote in a Texas Journalism Review article that

"When CNHI took over the Cleburne Times-Review from Donrey Media, they were real slow on paying a lot of their bills. ... When CNHI bought the Cleburne paper in July of 1998, Ralph Martin was chief executive officer. Some internal problems caused a change. Martin exited and Mike Reed became CEO. CNHI is known for cluster-bleeping community papers by combining printing plants but Martin chose to leave Cleburne in tact [sic]. Reed went for consolidation."
