= The Herald (Sharon) =

Daily newspaper in Pennsylvania

- We cover your world.
- Type: Daily newspaper
- Format: Broadsheet
- Owner: Community Newspaper Holdings Inc.
- Founder(s): R.C Frey and James Frey
- Publisher: Sharon A. Sorg
- Editor: Eric S. Poole
- Founded: April 14, 1864
- Headquarters: 52 South Dock Street, Sharon, Pennsylvania 16146 United States
- Circulation: 15,715 daily (as of 2013)
- Website: sharonherald.com

The Herald is a six-day morning daily newspaper published in Sharon, Pennsylvania, covering Mercer County and the greater Shenango Valley area of Pennsylvania. It is owned by Community Newspaper Holdings Inc., Montgomery, Ala. In 2020 in the midst of the COVID pandemic, it eliminated its 30-year-old Sunday edition and made its Tuesday edition digital-only. The Herald appears as a printed and digital edition the other five days of the week.

== History ==
On April 14, 1864, R.C. and James Frey published the first edition of The Sharon Herald, a weekly newspaper. It was converted to a daily newspaper nearly 45 years later, April 12, 1909.

The newspaper's office at the foot of Pitt Street in Sharon was washed into the Shenango River during a flood in March 1913. The newspaper missed only four issues and resumed publication with temporary production first in Farrell and then for about a month at the printing plant of the New Castle News before a new office and pressroom were set up on Chestnut Street in Sharon in the Willsonia Building.

The Herald merged with its main competitor, the Sharon News-Telegraph, May 13, 1935. The News-Telegraph incorporated the old Farrell News (founded 1925) and Sharon Telegraph (a daily since 1893). The new newspaper kept The Sharon Herald as its name but production moved to the News-Telegraph building two blocks away on South Dock Street.

The newspaper diversified during the mid-20th century, becoming part owner of Sharon radio station WPIC from 1938 to 1959; purchasing four eastern Mercer County weeklies in 1965, eventually merging them into the now-twice-weekly Allied News in Grove City; and founding a weekly newspaper, Hubbard Press, in Hubbard, Ohio in 1997. Hubbard Press ceased publication in 2012.

On Feb. 23, 1970, The Herald dropped "Sharon" from its nameplate to reflect its countywide audience. The next year, it was bought by Ottaway Newspapers, Inc., a division of Dow Jones & Company. Outside ownership brought the first Sunday edition, on September 9, 1990, and the launch of sharonherald.com in May 1996, making it one of the first Ottaway papers to be online. The Herald's Digital Edition (http://pdf.sharonherald.com), a subscription-only facsimile of the print edition available as Adobe Acrobat PDF pages, debuted in November 2001 as one of the first of its kind in the country.

In 1981, printing was moved from an aging Scott letterpress (which was bought used from Dayton, Ohio, in 1969) at the main office at 52 South Dock Street to the new Dow Jones & Company offset printing plant six miles away in Shenango Township that was built to print regional editions of the parent company's The Wall Street Journal. Page negatives photographed of pasted-up pages – and later, paginated pages sent directly to an imagesetter that produced page negatives – were driven to the plant for platemaking.

CNHI, the current owners, bought The Herald effective March 29, 2002. In the fall of 2002, The Herald switched to morning publication; it had published as a daily in the afternoon since 1909. It was not the first time the newspaper was printed in New Castle nor as a morning publication. Ironically, The Sharon Herald had been published both as a morning daily and at the New Castle News' printing plant as a professional courtesy (and transported to Sharon by train) for about a month after the flood of 1913 until The Herald re-established a pressroom in downtown Sharon and an afternoon publication cycle.

In 2026, the paper announced plans to sell its office of 91 years on South Dock Street and relocate to a new downtown space at 55 Pitt St.

== Production ==
The Herald is printed at the CNHI-owned West Penn Printing plant near New Castle in neighboring Lawrence County, Pennsylvania. The Herald also publishes a weekly newspaper, Allied News, covering outlying areas of eastern and southeastern Mercer County.

A 14-unit, single-wide DGM press configured with two full-color towers at West Penn Printing, built in five months on a brownfield on Sampson Street outside New Castle and placed in operation in early 2003, replaced an aging Goss Metro offset press that had been installed in 1968 at the News' downtown headquarters. Printing of The Herald, Allied News and Hubbard Press had been transferred to the downtown New Castle press in August 2002 from the TKS press line at the Wall Street Journal printing plant in West Middlesex, Pennsylvania, owned by The Herald's former parent company, Dow Jones & Company Inc. It had been printed there since the spring of 1981 when that plant opened.

== Controversy ==
In 2016, the media watchdog group iMediaEthics.org published an article criticizing how The Sharon Herald covered a local man's death by suicide.
