= The Register-Herald =

American newspaper in Beckley, West Virginia

- Type: Daily newspaper
- Format: Broadsheet
- Owner: Community Newspaper Holdings Inc.
- Publisher: Frank Wood
- Editor: J. Damon Cain
- Founded: 1985
- Headquarters: 801 North Kanawha Street; Beckley, West Virginia 25801
- Circulation: 19,237 (as of 2016)
- Website: Register-Herald.com

The Register-Herald is a five-day morning daily newspaper, Tuesday through Friday, with a weekend edition delivered on Saturday mornings. It is based in Beckley, West Virginia, United States. Its editor is Eric Cravey It also covers surrounding communities in Fayette, Greenbrier, Raleigh, Summers and Wyoming counties, West Virginia. It has a circulation of 19,237 and is owned by Community Newspaper Newspaper Holdings.

== History ==
The newspaper traces its history to the Raleigh Register, the Raleigh Herald, and the Beckley Evening Post, which were among a dozen weekly and monthly publications published in and around Beckley as early as the 1880s. The Raleigh Register developed into a modern daily newspaper and began seven-day publication on June 6, 1923. The Evening Post began daily publication on February 12, 1924. On May 31, 1926 the Herald and Evening Post combined as a morning daily newspaper known as the Beckley Post-Herald. On June 1, 1928, the Raleigh Register and Beckley Post-Herald came under common ownership, with the Post-Herald publishing Monday-Friday mornings, the Register publishing Monday-Friday afternoons, and with subscribers receiving a combined paper produced by the Post-Herald staff on Saturday and the Register staff on Sunday. Despite the common ownership, the Register was generally a Democratic newspaper, and the Post-Herald a Republican alternative. This arrangement continued until the sale of the newspapers to the owners of the Charleston Daily Mail in 1977. Following this, the editorial independence of the two publications declined, and the Register was slowly shut down. By 1981 the Register was simply an afternoon reprint and update of the Post-Herald, with a separate editorial page. On January 1, 1985 the two newspapers were completely combined under the current name.

The newspaper changed hands three times in the 1990s, before being acquired by its current owners in 2000. Circulation has waned with the declining population of the area.

Beckley Newspapers, a division of Community Newspaper Holdings Inc., publishes the Register-Herald and two weekly newspapers, the Fayette Tribune and the Montgomery Herald.

== See also ==
- List of newspapers in West Virginia
