= The Rider News =

Student newspaper of Rider University

- Type: Weekly student newspaper
- Format: Color Broadsheet
- Founded: 1930
- Headquarters: 2083 Lawrenceville Road; Lawrenceville, NJ 08648
- Website: theridernews.com

The Rider News is the weekly independent student newspaper of Rider University in Lawrenceville, New Jersey. The Rider News routinely wins top awards from the New Jersey Press Association and from the regional division of the Society of Professional Journalists, successfully competing against institutions from Maine to Eastern Pennsylvania. The newspaper is available on campus and online for free. The Rider News publishes once a week on Wednesday from September to May during the academic year. Students are responsible for all aspects of the publication, including writing, editing, photography, design, as well as maintaining its digital and social media platforms.

On August 1, 2024, university administrators informed newspaper staff its print budget was cut for the current fiscal year. This forced the newspaper to scale back its print schedule and reduce the number of pages from 12 to 8 per edition.

== About ==
Founded in 1930, the paper serves the entire Rider community. Each year, the student executive editor of The Rider News is awarded a full-tuition scholarship and the student managing editor is awarded a half-tuition scholarship. In addition, newspaper section editor posts are paid positions and serve as these students’ on-campus jobs. Paid student roles include: executive editor, managing editor, news section editors, features and entertainment editors, opinion editor, sports editors, copy editors, ad manager, photo editor, video editor, design manager and circulation managers.

== See also ==
- List of college newspapers
