= The Herald Bulletin =

American newspaper in Indiana, founded 1868

- Type: Daily newspaper
- Format: Broadsheet
- Owner: CNHI
- Publisher: Beverly Joyce
- Founded: 1868 (157 years ago)
- Headquarters: 1133 Jackson Street, Anderson, Indiana 46016 United States
- Circulation: 24,361 daily
- Price: USD .50
- Sister newspapers: Indiana: see list
- Website: www.heraldbulletin.com

The Herald Bulletin is a daily newspaper serving Anderson, Indiana, and adjacent areas northeast of Indianapolis. It is owned by CNHI.

== History ==
The Bulletin was established as a daily in 1883, adding a weekly edition on Saturday in 1885. The Herald was established as an independent Republican paper in 1868, by Stephen Metcalf. It was published weekly.

Anderson's two separate newspapers began operating as one company in 1949, publishing the Anderson Herald, founded as a weekly in 1868, in the morning, and the Anderson Daily Bulletin in the afternoon. Upon their sale to Ingersoll Publications, the two were combined into one morning edition, The Herald Bulletin, starting April 5, 1987. Ingersoll sold the paper to Thomson Corporation in 1990; in 2000, Thomson sold it to CNHI.

The paper's marketing slogan is "Because Life Changes Daily".
