= The Danville News =

Newspaper in Pennsylvania, US

Danville News
- Format: Broadsheet
- Owner(s): Community Newspaper Holdings Inc.
- Headquarters: Sunbury, Pennsylvania; United States

The Danville News is a newspaper published in Sunbury, Pennsylvania.

The publication is owned by Community Newspaper Holdings Inc., a company founded in 1997 by Ralph Martin. CNHI newspapers are clustered in groups that cross-sell packages to advertisers and occasionally feature editorial content written by a regional reporter working directly for CNHI.
