= The Express-Star =

Newspaper in Grady County, Oklahoma, US

- Type: Weekly newspaper
- Format: Broadsheet
- Owner(s): Community Newspaper Holdings LLC.
- Publisher: Katherine Miller
- Editor: Paxson Haws
- Headquarters: 401 W. Chickasha Ave, Ste 417; Chickasha, Oklahoma 73018; United States
- Circulation: 4,600 daily
- Website: chickashanews.com

The Express-Star, "Grady County's News Source", is a weekly newspaper published one day a week in Chickasha, Oklahoma, United States. The publication covers Grady County, Oklahoma. It is published Thursday.

The publication is owned by Community Newspaper Holdings LLC., a company founded in 1997 by Ralph Martin. CNHI newspapers cross-sell advertising packages and shares some editorial content through the CNHI News Service.
