= Lockport Union-Sun & Journal =

- Type: Daily newspaper
- Format: Broadsheet
- Owner: Community Newspaper Holdings Inc.
- Publisher: Cheryl Phillips
- Managing editor: Matt Winterhalter
- Founded: 1821
- Headquarters: 135 Main Street, Lockport, New York 14094
- Circulation: 5,679 Daily (as of 2017)
- Website: lockportjournal.com

The Lockport Union-Sun & Journal is a daily newspaper published in Lockport, New York, United States, and covering municipalities in eastern Niagara County. It is owned by Community Newspaper Holdings Inc. It is available online at www.lockportjournal.com.

It is considered a paper of public record by the Niagara County clerk's office.

The paper began publishing in 1821 as the Niagara Democrat and became The Lockport Observatory in 1822 after a move to Lockport.

Beginning the week of June 14, 2026, the print edition was reduced to three days per week (Tuesday, Thursday and Saturday) from the previous five days per week schedule (Tuesday to Saturday).
