= Cumberland Times-News =

Newspaper in Cumberland, Maryland

- Type: Daily newspaper
- Format: Broadsheet
- Owner: Community Newspaper Holdings Inc.
- Publisher: Chip Minemyer
- Editor: John Smith
- Headquarters: 19 Baltimore Street, Cumberland, Maryland 21502 U.S.
- Circulation: 9,000 daily
- Website: times-news.com

The Cumberland Times-News is a five-day morning daily newspaper serving Cumberland, Maryland, United States, and the surrounding areas of Allegany and Garrett counties in Maryland, and Mineral County in West Virginia. The paper, which has existed under various titles, dates back to the early 19th century.

In addition to its Cumberland headquarters, the newspaper maintained satellite bureaus in Frostburg and McHenry, Maryland, and in Keyser, West Virginia. The last of these, the Keyser bureau, closed in March 2009 in order to cut costs for the newspaper. Times-News staff also put out a subscription-based weekend edition covering business and politics throughout the region and state.

Thomson Newspapers bought the Times-News in 1986 from the McMullen family. Community Newspaper Holdings acquired the Times-News in 2000.

== See also ==
- List of Newspapers for Cumberland, Maryland 1808-Present
- Community Newspaper Holdings
