= Effingham Daily News =

Newspaper in Effingham, Illinois, founded in 1946

- Type: Daily newspaper
- Format: Broadsheet
- Owner: CNHI
- Publisher: Amy Winter
- Editor: Jeff Long
- Staff writers: Todd Buenker (Circulation Director)
- Advertising: Jody Hardiek
- Founded: 1946 (80 years ago)
- Headquarters: 201 North Banker Street, Effingham, Illinois 62401 United States
- Circulation: 904 daily
- Website: www.effinghamdailynews.com

The Effingham Daily News is a daily newspaper serving Effingham, Illinois, and surrounding portions of Clay, Cumberland, Effingham, Fayette, Jasper, Marion and Shelby counties, Illinois. It is owned by CNHI.

== History ==
Four newspapers merged in July 1946 to form the Effingham Daily News—the Effingham Daily Record, Effingham Democrat, Effingham Republican and County Review. The McNaughton family, which owned the paper for 46 years, sold it to Park Communications in December 1992. The paper was sold again in 1996 to Media General Inc., and to CNHI in 1997. Hollinger International bought the paper in December 1998, but sold it back to CNHI two years later.

Beginning March 1, 2025, the print edition was reduced to three days per week (Tuesday, Thursday and Saturday).
