= Washington Times Herald (Indiana) =

American newspaper in Indiana, founded 1867

Washington Times Herald (Washington, Indiana)
- Front page of July 27, 2013 edition
- Type: Daily newspaper
- Format: Broadsheet
- Owner: Community Newspaper Holdings Inc.
- Publisher: Amy Winter
- Editor: Lindsay J. Owens
- Founded: 1867
- Language: English
- Headquarters: 201 E. Main Street, Washington, Indiana 47501 USA
- Circulation: 9,121 daily
- Website: washtimesherald.com

The Washington Times Herald is a daily newspaper serving Washington, Indiana, and adjacent portions of Daviess County, Indiana. It is owned by Community Newspaper Holdings Inc. and presently the only daily newspaper in Washington, Indiana.

== History ==
Although the newspaper's motto is "Serving Washington and surrounding communities since 1867", the paper's history goes back to the Washington Democrat weekly, founded 1863. The Democrat changed its name to Daily Times in 1955; on June 1, 1964, it merged with the Washington Herald (not related to the Washington D.C. newspaper The Washington Herald) to form the Times Herald, by now the city's only daily newspaper.

On November 1, 1972, ownership of the paper passed from local families to Donrey Media Group, which held it until CNHI bought the Times Herald in September 1998.

Beginning March 1, 2025, the print edition was reduced to two days per week (Tuesday and Saturday) from the previous three days per week schedule (Tuesday, Thursday and Saturday).
