= Tonawanda News =

- Type: Daily newspaper
- Format: Broadsheet
- Owner(s): Community Newspaper Holdings Inc.
- Publisher: Peter Mio
- Editor: Eric Duvall
- Founded: 1880
- Headquarters: 435 River Road, North Tonawanda, New York 14120 United States
- Circulation: 6,443 Daily (as of 2006)
- Website: tonawanda-news.com

The Tonawanda News was a daily newspaper in North Tonawanda, New York, United States, covering part of Niagara County, as well as Tonawanda, the Town of Tonawanda and the Village of Kenmore in Erie County.

It was last owned by Greater Niagara Newspapers, a division of Community Newspaper Holdings Inc.

The newspaper won numerous AP and New York Newspaper Publisher Association awards for its coverage of major stories, including the crash of Flight 3407 in Clarence, N.Y.

The newspaper shut down January 31, 2015, due to financial insolvency.
