= Claremore Daily Progress =

Newspaper in Oklahoma, United States

- Type: Weekly newspaper
- Format: Broadsheet
- Owner: Community Newspaper Holdings Inc.
- News editor: Chelsea Weeks
- Staff writers: Jennifer Maupin
- Headquarters: 315 West Will Rogers Blvd; Claremore, Oklahoma 74017 United States
- Circulation: 900 Sunday, 500 weekdays
- Website: claremoreprogress.com

The Claremore Daily Progress is a newspaper published twice per week (print) and three times per week (electronic edition) in Claremore, Oklahoma, United States. Founded on June 29, 1892, it also sometimes covers the communities of Catoosa, Chelsea, Inola, Oologah, Tacora Hills, Pryor, Oklahoma, Twin Oaks and Verdigris in Rogers County, Oklahoma.
