= The Rocket (Slippery Rock) =

Weekly newspaper published by the students of Slippery Rock University

The Rocket is a weekly newspaper published by the students of Slippery Rock University. It was established in 1934. Its weekly circulation was 7,000 in 2015.

== History ==
The Rocket began publication in 1934. Student participation and journalism enrollment increased in the 1970s, following the Watergate scandal controversy. In 1970 its front page showed a simulated wanted poster accusing U.S. President Richard Nixon of "homicide and conspiracy". The alumni association and faculty council denounced the issue, but the college stated that the paper had its own editorial policy and was a publication by students. The paper again found itself in the news when its editorial cartoon in 2006 dealt with reverse racism.

== Organization ==
The newspaper has three sections: News, Sports, and Campus Life. It is published every Friday during the academic period with the exception of holidays, exam periods and vacations. In 2015 Mark Zeltner was the adviser to The Rocket.

== Circulation and distribution ==
The Rocket has a total weekly circulation of 7,000 and is distributed throughout campus and the surrounding community of Slippery Rock, Pennsylvania.

== Original comics ==
The Rocket has published Slippery Rock University students' original comics, including an editorial cartoon and two comic strips, a more serious action comic titled "The Rock" and a traditional comic titled Homeless and the Cat. The latter of the two underwent title and character changes as it was taken over by different authors. It is now titled Homeless and the Kid. A comic strip titled "Life at the Rock" was featured in 1999 penned by Corey Bugenhagen.

In addition, the comic strip The Life of Bobbin was featured in 1994 and 1995 penned by Rob Gerlach.
