= The Orange Leader (Texas) =

- Type: Semiweekly newspaper (Wednesday, Saturday)
- Format: Broadsheet
- Owner: Boone Newspapers
- Publisher: Stephen Hemelt
- Editor: Stephen Hemelt
- Founded: 1875
- Headquarters: 1008 Green Ave. Orange, Texas 77631; United States
- Circulation: 931 (as of 2023)
- Website: orangeleader.com

The Orange Leader is a morning newspaper published Wednesdays and Saturdays in Orange, Texas, covering Orange County. It is owned by Boone Newspapers.

== History ==
After buying two local weeklies (Note: The Orange-based Opportunity Valley News and Port Arthur-based Community Post.) in the region in 1980, Cox Enterprises bought the daily Leader in 1985 from owner/publisher James B. Quigley, who had led the paper since 1937. Harry G. Wood, the editor of the nearby Cox newspaper The Port Arthur News, was installed as publisher at that time.

In 1991, Cox sold the Leader and the Port Arthur newspaper to American Publishing Company, which in turn dealt them to Community Newspaper Holdings in 1999. After cutting publication from seven days to three (Tuesday, Thursday, Saturday) in 2011 and later to two days, the pair was sold to Boone Newspapers Inc. in 2014.
