= Tribune-Star =

American newspaper in Indiana, founded 1894

- Type: Daily newspaper
- Format: Broadsheet
- Owner: Community Newspaper Holdings Inc.
- Publisher: Robyn McCloskey
- Editor: Max Jones
- Headquarters: 2800 Poplar St., Suite 37A, Terre Haute, Indiana 47803 United States
- Circulation: 27,895 daily (as of 2007)
- Price: USD .75/Daily $1.75/Sunday
- Website: tribstar.com

The Tribune-Star is a five-day morning daily newspaper based in Terre Haute, Indiana, covering the Wabash Valley area of Indiana and Illinois. It is owned by Community Newspaper Holdings. Counties within the newspaper's coverage areas include Clay, Greene, Parke, Sullivan, Vermillion and Vigo counties, Indiana, and Clark, Crawford and Edgar counties, Illinois. It was preceded by The Tribune.

== History ==
The Tribune was founded in December 1894, with Republican George B. Lockwood among its co-founders. James Solomon Barcus bought the paper in 1902. In 1904, Barcus also bought the Terre Haute Gazette (which dated to around 1869) and merged it into the Tribune. (The combined paper was known, at least briefly, as the Tribune-Gazette.)

Advertisement for the launch of the Terre Haute Morning Star, Aug. 28, 1903.

The Star was founded in August 1903 and was bought by the owners of the Tribune in 1931. (The Terre Haute Post, founded in 1906, was acquired by the Star in 1929.)

A 230-day strike shut down both the Tribune and Star in 1964–65.

The Tribune and Star were sold to Ingersoll Publications in late 1982. Prior to the sale, Rose-Hulman Institute of Technology owned a controlling interest in the papers. In May 1983, the morning Star and afternoon Tribune were merged to become the morning-published Tribune-Star, part of the nationwide trend of the period away from afternoon papers.

In 1990, Ingersoll sold a number of papers including the Tribune-Star to Thomson Corporation. In 2000, Community purchased the Tribune-Star and 16 other papers from Thomson, as a part of Thompson's exit from the U.S. newspaper business.

On Sept. 2, 2023, the paper announced it would switch to delivery via the U.S. Postal Service starting Oct. 3. At that time, 40% of subscribers already received the paper via mail.
