= The Tribune-Democrat =

Newspaper published in Pennsylvania, U.S.

- Type: Daily newspaper
- Format: Broadsheet
- Owner: CNHI LLC.
- Publisher: Chip Minemyer
- Editor: Renée Carthew
- Founded: 1853, as Cambria Tribune
- Headquarters: 425 Locust Street; Johnstown, Pennsylvania, United States
- Circulation: 12,000 daily
- Website: tribune-democrat.com

The Tribune-Democrat is a five-day morning daily newspaper published in Johnstown, Pennsylvania. It is owned by CNHI LLC.

The newspaper's coverage area includes all or parts of Blair, Bedford, Cambria, Indiana, Somerset and Westmoreland counties in Pennsylvania.

Founded as the weekly Cambria Tribune in 1853, the newspaper converted to afternoon daily format in 1873, taking the name Johnstown Tribune. It merged in 1952 with the morning Johnstown Democrat (founded in 1863, a daily since 1888). The combined Tribune-Democrat published two editions, morning and afternoon, until 1977, when the paper dropped its afternoon edition and also debuted a Sunday edition.

In 1987, the paper was sold to MediaNews Group. It was traded to Hollinger International in 1996. When Hollinger sold off the majority of its papers in 1999, The Tribune-Democrat went to current owner Community Newspaper Holdings.
