= The Norman Transcript =

Daily newspaper published in Norman, Oklahoma

- "Trusted, Tested, Timeless"
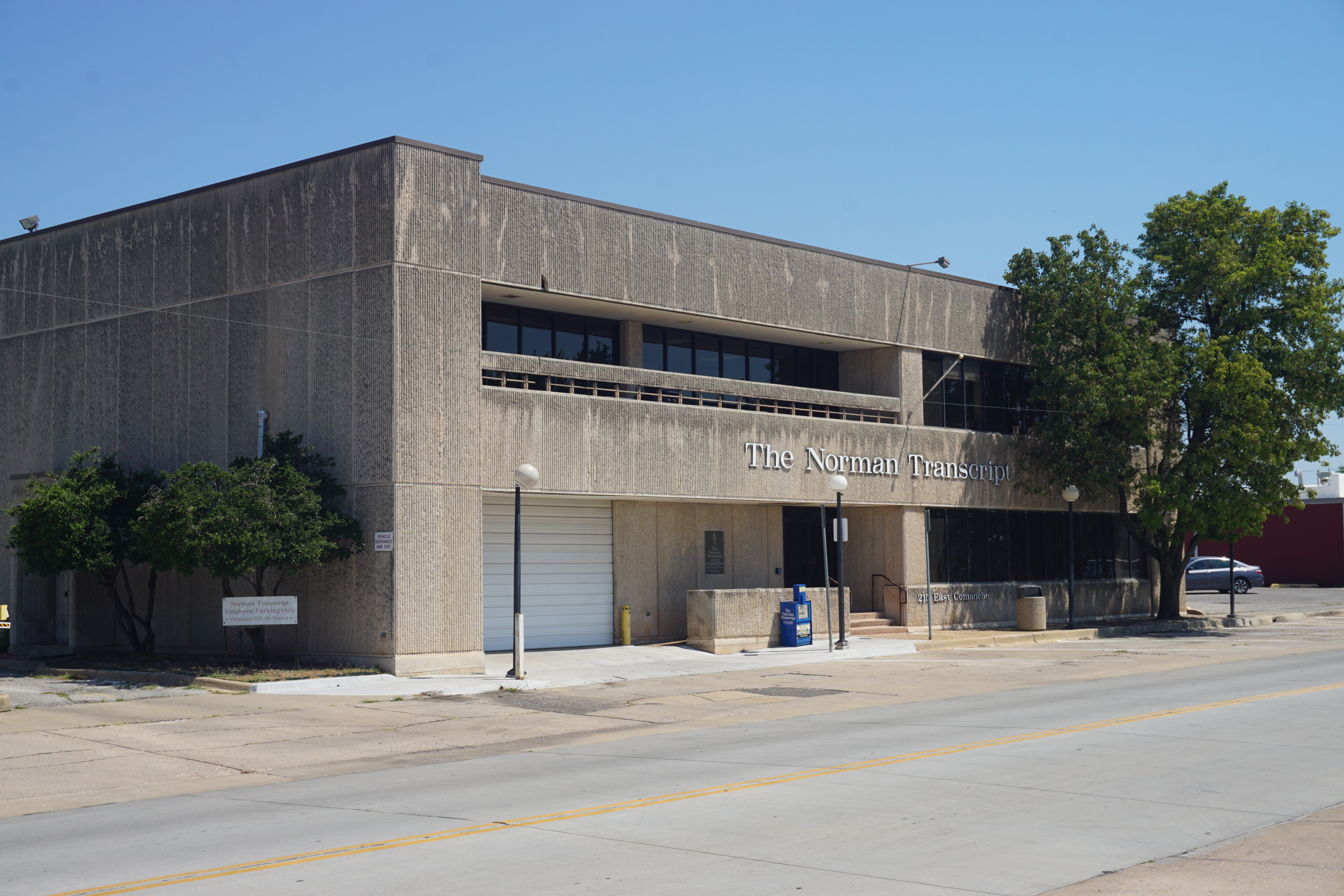
- The Norman Transcript building
- Type: Daily newspaper
- Format: Broadsheet
- Owner: Community Newspaper Holdings Inc.
- Publisher: Katherine Miller
- Editor: Ben Fenwick
- Founded: July 13, 1889
- Headquarters: 215 East Comanche Street; Norman, Oklahoma 73069 United States
- Circulation: 13,825 Daily; 14,036 Sunday (as of 2006)
- Website: normantranscript.com

The Norman Transcript is a daily newspaper published in Norman, Oklahoma, United States, covering Cleveland and McClain counties, in the southern suburbs of Oklahoma City. It is owned by Community Newspaper Holdings Inc.

The newspaper is the oldest business in Norman. It was founded by settler Edward Philip Ingle on July 13, 1889.

The newspaper's marketing slogan is "Trusted, Tested, Timeless.”

== History ==
The newspaper was founded by settler Edward Philip Ingle on July 13, 1889, shortly after the first Oklahoma Land Run of April 22, 1889. Ingle had previously owned and operated the Purcell Register newspaper from 1887 to 1889, across the South Canadian River in the then-Chickasaw Nation.

The first edition described Ingle's hopes for the newspaper, that "It will ever be a champion of the people and will be found ready to investigate both sides of any question of importance for the welfare of the people." The first two issues of the Transcript were published in July 1889, with a hiatus until later in the autumn. The Norman Transcript has been published regularly since then.

The weekly newspaper was sold to J.J. Burke in 1903. Burke established a companion free daily newspaper in 1912, later merging the two editions into a paid daily in 1917. Fred E. Tarman joined The Transcript in 1922 as editor and remained in that position until his retirement in 1969. Harold R. Belknap became editor and publisher at that time, and his heirs sold it to the paper's first chain owner, Donrey Media Group, in 1985; CNHI bought The Transcript from Donrey in 1998.

James M. Flinchum worked at The Transcript in the late 1930s before joining United Press and later as editor-in-chief of the Wyoming State Tribune, forerunner of the Wyoming Tribune Eagle in Cheyenne, Wyoming.
