= The Free Press (Mankato) =

American newspaper in Minnesota, founded in 1887

Coordinates: 44.163849°N 94.004880°W

- Front page, 27 June 2024
- Type: Daily newspaper
- Format: Broadsheet
- Owner: CNHI
- Publisher: Steve Jameson
- Editor: Joe Spear
- Founded: 1887 (139 years ago)
- Political alignment: Independent
- Language: American English
- Headquarters: 418 South Second Street; Mankato, MN
- City: Mankato
- Country: United States
- Circulation: 12,076 (as of 2024)
- OCLC number: 15579049
- Website: www.mankatofreepress.com

The Free Press is an American, English language daily newspaper published in Mankato, Minnesota.

== History ==
The first newspaper published in Mankato, the Mankato Weekly Independent, began publication in 1857. Six years later, it was bought by Charles Slocum and named the Mankato Union. Then in 1880 the Union and its rival Mankato paper, the Record, merged and became the Mankato Weekly Free Press. It ran as a weekly until 1887, when it became a daily. The word "Daily" was dropped from its name in 1940 and 30 years later, "Mankato" was dropped.

The last local owner of the paper was Jared How, who sold The Free Press Co. to Ottaway Newspapers Inc., a wholly owned subsidiary of Dow Jones & Company. Ottaway acquired 11 percent of the company in 1977 and the remainder in 1979. In 2002, Ottaway sold The Free Press and other papers to Community Newspaper Holdings Inc. (later renamed CNHI). On its 50th anniversary, The Free Press circulation was 12,000. In 2024, the circulation was 12,476. That year, due to rising costs, the paper stopped printing its Monday issue of the newspaper, though an electronic edition would continue to be published on their website. In 2026, the Sunday print edition ceased with an expanded "Weekender" published on Saturdays.

The Free Press also publishes the Mankato Magazine, MNValley Business magazine and The Land, a Minnesota farm and rural life publication. It also serves readers through its website, which launched in 1994. It was named the 2010 CNHI Newspaper of the Year and in 2013 was named the CNHI Best Website.

== Content ==
The Free Press news staff covers six counties – Blue Earth, Nicollet, Le Sueur, Brown, Waseca and Watonwan. The major cities of Mankato, North Mankato, Waseca, St. Peter and Le Sueur are also primary coverage areas. It also has wide coverage of local sports and Minnesota State University in Mankato. It also is the publisher of Mankato Magazine (circulation 10,000), the MN Valley Business magazine and The Land (circulation 35,000).

== See also ==
- List of newspapers in Minnesota
