= CNHI =

American publisher

CNHI, LLC
- Formerly: Community Newspaper Holdings, Inc.
- Type: Subsidiary
- Industry: Newspaper publishing
- Founded: 1997; 29 years ago
- Founder: Ralph Martin
- Headquarters: Montgomery, Alabama, U.S.
- Key people: George Wakefield (chairman); Donna J. Barrett (president & CEO); Chris Cato (CEO)
- Revenue: ▲$520 million USD (2009)
- Number of employees: 6,501 (2007)
- Parent: Retirement Systems of Alabama
- Website: cnhi.com

CNHI, LLC (an abbreviation of its original name, Community Newspaper Holdings, Inc.) is an American publisher of newspapers and advertising-related publications throughout the United States. The company was formed in 1997 by Ralph Martin, and is based in Montgomery, Alabama (after moving from Birmingham, Alabama in September 2011). The company is financed by, and is a subsidiary of, the Retirement Systems of Alabama (RSA).

== History ==
The company was formed through acquisitions, starting with the acquisition of many of the smaller former Park papers from Media General. Two years later, it bought several papers from Hollinger International. In 2000, it acquired another batch of papers from the Thomson Corporation.

In 2002, CNHI paid $182 million for four daily newspapers and other non-daily publications from Ottaway Newspapers Inc., the community newspaper group of Dow Jones & Company, Inc., which had determined that these markets were not growth opportunities. In 2006, the company acquired 6 more newspapers from Ottaway. Ottaway used $144 million of the 2002 sale to buy The Record newspaper in Stockton, California, in 2003. In September 2013, Dow Jones, which had renamed the properties as Dow Jones Local Media Group, sold the entire remaining group of 33 community newspapers to Newcastle Investment Corp. for a total of only $87 million. In 2007, CNHI sold the Santa Cruz Sentinel, a former Ottaway publication, to MediaNews Group.

As of 2006, CNHI owned 90 daily newspapers and more than 200 non-daily newspapers in 22 states. George Wakefield is CNHI chairman; Donna Barrett is president and CEO. CNHI newspapers are clustered in groups that cross-sell packages to advertisers and occasionally feature shared editorial content.

In 2009, CNHI implemented mandatory furloughs for most non-sales staff, requiring employees to take a mandatory week off without pay every quarter. As of 2015, these DOWOP (days off without pay) were still in effect. Also in 2014, most CNHI newspaper sites put a paywall into place, requiring readers to subscribe after reading 5 articles.

On June 24, 2010, the company announced that it would relocate its headquarters and about 70 jobs to Montgomery, Alabama, into the RSA Dexter Tower Building when that building is complete in late 2011 or early 2012. Like its former headquarters in Birmingham, the new building is owned by RSA, which is the principal source of investment funding for CNHI. David G. Bronner, CEO of RSA, said the move will be good for the community and the company. The Montgomery Advertiser newspaper reported that Bronner was a key player in the move. With CNHI's Birmingham lease expiring, the decision to bring the company to Montgomery "was something that I strongly suggested," he said, according to the newspaper. The city and Montgomery County offered $300,000 in incentives to pay moving costs for the company.

In April 2012, along with GateHouse Media, Lee Enterprises and the E. W. Scripps Company, CNHI invested in Find n Save, an online company which offers local media an online shopping platform.

On September 25, 2017, Raycom Media announced that it would merge with CNHI. Both companies are already principally owned by RSA, and there were to be administrative and content synergies between the properties. CNHI continued to operate as a subsidiary of Raycom. To comply with FCC newspaper cross-ownership restrictions, CNHI was to divest papers in the seven markets where Raycom also owns television stations.

In January 2018, CNHI announced it would be moving to a regional editor system where a small number of editors would oversee coverage of regions and states.

On June 25, 2018, Gray Television announced it would be acquiring Raycom's television assets. CNHI was not included in the sale to Gray and CNHI is currently seeking to sell off its newspapers, as a whole or piecemeal. With the completion of the purchase on January 2, 2019, the newspapers were re-organized to a direct subsidiary of RSA as Raycom ceased to exist.

In May 2024, CNHI sold ten newspapers across Alabama, Georgia and Mississippi, along with a print facility, to Carpenter Media Group.

In January 2025, CNHI furloughed 46 employees, roughly 3% of the company's workforce.

== CNHI newspapers ==
As can be inferred by its former name of Community Newspaper Holdings Inc., CNHI tends to acquire newspapers in smaller markets and suburbs of larger cities. As of December 2006, few of its dailies had circulations above 20,000, including:

- The Eagle-Tribune of North Andover, Massachusetts—49,700
- The Tribune-Democrat of Johnstown, Pennsylvania—41,200
- The Joplin Globe of Joplin, Missouri—30,600
- Cumberland Times-News of Cumberland, Maryland—30,200
- The Salem News of Salem, Massachusetts—30,000
- The Register-Herald of Beckley, West Virginia—28,700
- Tribune-Star of Terre Haute, Indiana—27,900
- The Herald Bulletin of Anderson, Indiana—24,300
- Kokomo Tribune of Kokomo, Indiana—21,900
- Mankato Free Press of Mankato, Minnesota—21,700
- The Herald of Sharon, Pennsylvania—20,400
- Bluefield Daily Telegraph of Bluefield, West Virginia—20,400

== See also ==
- Concentration of media ownership
