= List of newspapers in Indiana =

This is a list of newspapers in Indiana.

== Daily newspapers ==
List is in order of place of publication

- Indiana Republic Times
- Anderson Herald Bulletin – Anderson
- The Herald Republican – Angola
- The Star – Auburn
- The Herald Tribune – Batesville
- Bedford Times-Mail – Bedford
- The Herald-Times – Bloomington
- Bluffton News Banner – Bluffton
- The Brazil Times – Brazil
- Jackson County Banner – Brownstown
- Chesterton Tribune – Chesterton
- The Post & Mail – Columbia City
- The Republic – Columbus
- News Examiner – Connersville
- The Corydon Democrat – Corydon
- Journal Review – Crawfordsville
- The Paper of Montgomery County – Crawfordsville
- Decatur Daily Democrat – Decatur
- News Sun & Evening Star – DeKalb County
- The Dubois County Herald – Dubois County
- The Elkhart Truth – Elkhart
- Evansville Courier & Press – Evansville
- The Journal Gazette – Fort Wayne
- The Times – Frankfort
- Daily Journal of Johnson County – Franklin
- Goshen News – Goshen
- Banner-Graphic – Greencastle
- Daily Reporter – Greenfield
- Greensburg Daily News – Greensburg
- Hartford City News-Times – Hartford City
- Indianapolis Business Journal – Indianapolis
- Indianapolis Daily Evening Gazette
- The Indianapolis Recorder – Indianapolis
- The Indianapolis Star – Indianapolis
- The Indianapolis Times - Indianapolis
- The Herald – Jasper / Dubois County
- Evening News and Tribune – Jeffersonville
- The News Sun – Kendallville
- Kokomo Tribune – Kokomo
- Herald-Argus – La Porte
- Journal & Courier – Lafayette
- The Daily Sun – Lebanon
- Lebanon Reporter – Lebanon
- Greene County Daily World – Linton
- Pharos-Tribune – Logansport
- Madison Courier – Madison
- Chronicle-Tribune – Marion
- Reporter Times – Martinsville
- Post-Tribune – Merrillville
- The News-Dispatch – Michigan City
- The Paper of Montgomery County – Montgomery County
- Herald Journal – Monticello
- The Star Press – Muncie
- Muncie Voice – Muncie
- The Times of Northwest Indiana – Munster
- The Courier-Times – New Castle
- Farmer's Exchange – New Paris
- Newburgh Chandler Register – Newburgh
- Noblesville Daily Times – Noblesville
- Sagamore News Media – Noblesville
- Plain Dealer & Sun – North Vernon
- Paoli News-Republican – Paoli
- Indiana Plain Dealer – Peru
- Shelbyville News – Plainfield
- The Pilot News – Plymouth
- Commercial Review – Portland
- Princeton Daily Clarion – Princeton
- Palladium-Item – Richmond
- The Rochester Sentinel – Rochester
- Rushville Republican – Rushville
- Seymour Tribune – Seymour
- Shelbyville News – Shelbyville
- South Bend Tribune – South Bend
- Spencer Evening World – Spencer
- Journal of Business – Terre Haute
- Tribune-Star – Terre Haute
- The Republican Journal – Versailles
- Vincennes Sun-Commercial – Vincennes
- Times-Union – Warsaw
- Washington Times Herald – Washington
- Times Sentinel – Zionsville

== Weekly newspapers ==
- El Tribuna de Indianapolis – Indianapolis
- The Fountain County Neighbor – Attica
- Hendricks County Flyer – Avon
- Journal-Press – Aurora
- Times - Crothersville
- Frost Illustrated – Fort Wayne
- Ink newspaper – Fort Wayne
- The Waynedale News – Fort Wayne
- The Neighbor – Fountain and Warren Counties
- The Benton Review – Fowler
- Gary Crusader – Gary
- NUVO – Indianapolis
- The Southside Times – Indianapolis
- Kendallville Mall – Kendallville
- Newton County Enterprise – Kentland
- Parke County Sentinel – Rockville
- Kokomo Perspective – Kokomo
- Dearborn County Register – Lawrenceburg
- Mt. Vernon Democrat – Mt. Vernon
- Brown County Democrat – Nashville
- Posey County News – New Harmony
- The News-Journal – North Manchester
- Spencer County Journal Democrat – Rockport
- The Sheridan News – Sheridan
- Perry County News – Tell City
- The Review Republican – Williamsport
- The Mishawaka Enterprise – Mishawaka
- The Regional News – LaCrosse
- Western Wayne News - Wayne County
- Westville Indicator – Westville

== Biweekly newspapers ==
- The Indiana Weekender – Indianapolis
- Mooresville Times – Mooresville
- The News-Gazette – Winchester

== Monthly newspapers ==
- Aboite & About – Fort Wayne and Roanoke
- Our Hometown News – Avilla & Noble County
- The Muncie Times – Muncie (bi-monthly)
- The Beacon – Southeastern Indiana
- The Village Sampler – Broad Ripple Village, Indianapolis, Published June 1987 - December 1998

== Newspapers in languages other than English ==
- Makedonska Tribuna (Macedonian Tribune) – Fort Wayne (Macedonian)
- La Voz de Indiana – Indianapolis (bilingual – English and Spanish)
- Magyarsag – South Bend (Hungarian)
- El Tribuna de Indianapolis – Indianapolis (bilingual – English and Spanish)
- El Tribuna de Lafayette – Lafayette (bilingual – English and Spanish)
- El Tribuna de Fort Wayne – Fort Wayne (bilingual – English and Spanish)

== University newspapers ==
- The Andersonian – Anderson University
- The Ball State Daily News – Ball State University
- The Butler Collegian – Butler University
- Earlham College Word – Earlham College
- The Franklin - Franklin College
- Goshen College Record – Goshen College
- Indiana Daily Student – Indiana University Bloomington
- The Campus Citizen – Indiana University Purdue University at Indianapolis (IUPUI)
- The Communicator – Indiana University Purdue University at Fort Wayne (IPFW)
- The Preface – Indiana University South Bend
- The Horizon – Indiana University Southeast
- Indiana Statesman – Indiana State University
- The Phoenix – Marian University
- Purdue Exponent – Purdue University
- The Chronicle – Purdue University Calumet
- The Irish Rover – University of Notre Dame
- The Observer – University of Notre Dame
- The Shield – University of Southern Indiana
- The Torch – Valparaiso University
- The Bachelor – Wabash College
- The Reflector – University of Indianapolis

== Defunct ==
- Amateur Reporter (Washington) (1882–1883)
- The Andrews Signal (1893–1952)
- Blackford County Democrat (Hartford City) (1857–1861)
- Blackford County Gazette (Hartford City) (1901–1905)
- Blackford County News (Hartford City) (1852–1859)
- Brookville American (1858–1861)
- Carthage Record (18??-190?)
- The Daily Clintonian – Clinton
- The Colored Visitor (Logansport) (1879-18??)
- Daily Gazette (Hartford City) (1901–1903)
- Daily Journal (Hartford City) (1909–1915)
- The Daily Republican (Seymour) (?-1899)
- The DePauw Daily (Greencastle) (?-1920)
- Daily State Sentinel (Indianapolis) (1861–1884)
- The Disseminator (New Harmony) (1828–1841)
- Evansville Press (1906–1998)
- Evening News (Hartford City) (1894–1937)
- Fort Wayne World (1884–1885)
- The News-Sentinel – Fort Wayne
- The Freeman (Indianapolis) (1884–1927)
- Gary Tribune/Gary Daily Tribune (1914–1921)
- Hagerstown Exponent (1876–2004)
- Hartford City Arena (1891–1895)
- Hartford City Courier (1873–1875)
- Hartford City Democrat (1869–1872)
- Hartford City Press (1892–1894)
- Hartford City Telegram (1875–1914)
- Hartford City Times (1852–?)
- Hartford City Times (1885–1905)
- Hartford City Union (1861–1871)
- The Hazleton Herald (1896–?)
- The Hazleton News (c.1888)
- The Herald (Lynn) (?-192?)
- Hoosier Topics (Cloverdale) (19??-????)
- Indiana Palladium (Lawrenceburg) (1825–1836)
- Indiana-Posten (South Bend) (1899–?)
- Indiana State Sentinel (Indianapolis) (1845–1851)
- Indiana Tribüne (Indianapolis) (1878–1907)
- Indianapolis Daily Herald (1865–1868)
- Indianapolis Journal (1867–1904)
- Indianapolis Leader (1879–1890)
- Indianapolis Ledger (1912–19??)
- Indianapolis News (1869–1999)
- Indianapolis Sentinel (1880–1904)
- Indianapolis Times (1888–1965)
- Indianapolis World (188?–19??)
- Irvington Review and Irvingtonian (Indianapolis) (1937–1939)
- Jamestown Tribune (18??-18??)
- Jasper Weekly Courier (1858–1922)
- Jedność (Gary) (1975-19??)
- Kosciusko Co. Standard (Leesburg) (188?–1???)
- Kurjer (Gary) (1937–????)
- La Porte Chronicle (1874–1880)
- Lake City Commercial (Warsaw) (1859–1860)
- Leesburg Journal (Leesburg) (19??-19??)
- Leesburg News (1939–1999)
- Lyons Herald (c.1939)
- Marshall County Democrat (1855–1859)
- Marshall County Republican (Plymouth) (1856–1878)
- Messenger Crier (Crawfordsville) (19??-????)
- The Microscope and General Advertiser (New Albany) (1824–1825)
- Muncietown Telegraph (1841–1842)
- Nasze życie (East Chicago) (1936-19??)
- The National Republican (Muncie) (1914–1925)
- New Albany Daily Ledger (1849–1871)
- New-Harmony Gazette (1825–1828)
- Newport Hoosier State (1890–1895)
- News (Hartford City) (1873–1885)
- Noble County Herald (Albion) (1860–1866)
- The Paper (Elkhart) (?-2000)
- Plymouth Banner (1852–1855)
- Plymouth Democrat (1869–1941)
- Plymouth Tribune (1901–1911)
- Randolph County Journal (Winchester) (1855–1862)
- Record-Herald (Butler) (1928–1977)
- Register (Hartford City) (1856)
- Republican (Hartford City) (1895–1896)
- Richmond Palladium (Richmond) (1831–1837)
- Rockport Democrat
- Rockport Journal
- Rockport Weekly Democrat (1855–?)
- The Sandborn Herald (Sandborn) (1905–?)
- Saturday Siftings (Hartford City) (1891–<1894)
- The Semi-Weekly Dispatch (Winslsow) (?-1904)
- Shelby Democrat (1???-1947)
- Smithville News (1908–19??)
- The Statesman, and Clark County Advertiser (Charlestown) (18??-18??)
- Terre Haute Advocate (?-197?)
- Times-Gazette (Hartford City) (1905–1937)
- Trainman (Indianapolis) (1947–1968)
- Vincennes Gazette (1830–1844)
- Wabash Express (Terre Haute) (1841-186?)
- Walton Enterprise (192?–19??)
- Weekly Post (Bethlehem) (1892-1???)
- Winchester Journal (18??-1920)

== See also ==
Comprehensive

- Lists of newspapers
- List of newspapers in the United States

Frequency

- List of free daily newspapers in the United States
- List of weekly newspapers in the United States

Circulation

- List of international newspapers originating in the United States
- List of national newspapers in the United States
- List of newspapers in the United States by circulation

Foreign language

- List of French-language newspapers published in the United States
- List of German-language newspapers published in the United States
- List of Spanish-language newspapers published in the United States

Specialty

- List of African-American newspapers in the United States
- List of alternative weekly newspapers in the United States
- List of business newspapers in the United States
- List of family-owned newspapers in the United States
- List of Jewish newspapers in the United States
- List of LGBTQ periodicals in the United States
- List of student newspapers in the United States
- List of supermarket tabloids in the United States
- List of underground press in the United States

Other

- List of defunct newspapers of the United States
