= Vincent Gaddis =

American author (1913–1997)

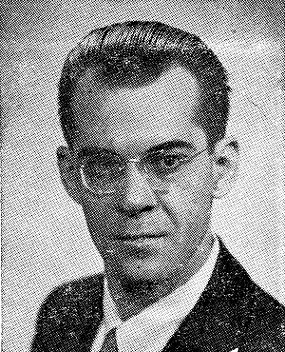
- Born: Vincent Hayes Gaddis; December 28, 1913; Ohio, U.S.
- Died: February 26, 1997 (aged 83); Eureka, California
- Occupation: Paranormal writer

Vincent Hayes Gaddis (December 28, 1913 – February 26, 1997) was an American author who invented the phrase "Bermuda Triangle", which he used first in the cover article for the 1964 February issue of the magazine Argosy. He popularized many stories about anomalous and paranormal phenomena in a style similar to that of Charles Fort.

== Career ==
Gaddis was born in Ohio to Tilden H. and Alice M. (Smith) Gaddis. He married Margaret Paine Rea on July 14, 1947. Gaddis worked as a newspaper reporter and writer-editor for a Warsaw, Indiana, radio station from 1947 to 1952. He was a feature writer for the Elkhart Truth, a daily newspaper in Elkhart, Indiana, from 1952 to 1959. He then worked as a public relations writer for Studebaker-Packard Corporation and Mercedes Benz Sales in South Bend, Indiana. In 1962 he became a freelance writer. He died in Eureka, California.

== Reception ==
Gaddis' statements on the Bermuda Triangle and spontaneous human combustion have been criticized by skeptics for being inaccurate and misleading. Gaddis has also drawn strong criticism for ignoring possible natural explanations and inventing mysteries where none exist.

Historian William K. Powers from Livingston College, Rutgers University has described Gaddis' American Indian Myths and Mysteries as an "outrageous and intolerable book" filled with crackpot claims and "Danikenesque delusions".

== Published works ==
- Winona Lake: A Memory and A Vision, 1949
- Invisible Horizons: True Mysteries of the Sea, 1965
- Mysterious Fires and Lights, 1967
- Wide World of Magic, 1967
- Strange World of Animals and Pets, 1970
- The Curious World of Twins, 1972
- Courage in Crisis: Dramatic Tales of Heroism in the Face of Danger, 1973
- American Indian Myths and Mysteries, 1977, ISBN 0-88029-755-7
- Gold Rush Ghosts, 1990, ISBN 0-945685-06-8

== See also ==
- Philadelphia Experiment
- Crawfordsville monster
- Raifuku Maru
