= AIM Media =

AIM Media may refer to:

- Active Interest Media, a specialty magazine publisher
- AIM Media Management, a newspaper publisher based in Dallas, Texas, or one of its subsidiaries:
  - AIM Media Midwest
  - AIM Media Indiana
  - AIM Media Texas
