= Newspapers in the United States =

American newspaper publications

Newspapers have been published in the United States since the 18th century and are an integral part of the culture of the United States. Although a few newspapers including The New York Times, USA Today, and The Wall Street Journal are sold throughout the United States, most American newspapers are published for city or regional markets. The New York Times, The Wall Street Journal, and The Washington Post are often referred to as the United States' "newspaper of record".

From 1948 to 1998, daily newspaper circulation in the United States fell from 1.3 papers per household to 0.6 papers per household. From 2005 to 2024, the number of active daily or weekly print newspapers in the United States fell from 8,891 to 5,595 or approximately one-third of all publications.

== History ==
The history of American newspapers dates to the early 18th century, when the first colonial newspapers were published. In the beginning, newspapers were a sideline for printers, but they eventually became a political force and played a role in the campaign for American independence. The First Amendment to the U.S. Constitution guaranteed freedom of the press, and the Postal Service Act of 1792 provided subsidies for the delivery of newspapers. During the First Party System (1790s-1810s), both parties sponsored papers to reach their loyal supporters. In the 1830s, the penny press began to play a major role in American journalism, and technological advancements such as the telegraph and faster printing presses helped to expand the press of the nation. In the 1840s through 1880s, the ongoing development of news agencies (to which individual papers subscribed for content) further helped expand the press, as a way to split the costs of distant reporting rather than duplicating them. In the early 20th century, newspapers were profitable and influential, but with the rise of television in the 1920s, the role of newspapers began to shift. In the late 20th century, many American journalism outlets became part of big media chains via consolidation of the industry.

The explosive rise of extensive internet use by the general public in the 21st century has caused a business crisis for newspapers, even despite most publishing both online and print versions. As the revenue from print advertising has fallen off sharply, the revenue from digital advertising is uneven and often poor, and readership has declined as many members of the public choose to get their news in other ways (such as social media or YouTube); this despite the alternative sources generally of lesser completeness or quality, owing to factors such as (1) absence of paywall and (2) real or perceived reasons to distrust the mainstream media. However, regarding the latter factor, even newsrooms that are or purport to be of the alternative media grapple with the economics of the percentage of readers who (1) refuse to pay for news and (2) are willing to simply do without any non-sensationalism types of news.

The economic situation has steadily worsened in recent years. The U.S. newspaper market was $21 billion in 2024, but it's projected to shrink at a rate of -1.3% annually through 2030. Print circulation continues to plunge—weekday print dropped 13% and Sunday print 16% in 2022 alone. Even digital traffic is plateauing, and many local papers don't generate much online revenue. Advertising revenue, once the lifeblood of newspapers, has collapsed as advertisers shifted to digital platforms like Google and Facebook.

== Demographics ==
Metropolitan newspapers survive in all major metropolitan regions, with some regions having multiple papers, though this has declined in modern times. Many smaller cities have had local newspapers, again, this having declined over time.

There have also been many African-American newspapers, foreign-language papers, and other specialized newspapers. As of 2023 there were 24 newspapers published in prisons.

== Archives ==
In the 20th century many libraries in the United States provided microform archives of selected U.S. newspapers, typically as microfilm (rolls) or microfiche (sheets), and several desks with readers (machines) for viewing these physical media were commonly available in the reading rooms of many public libraries and university libraries. Individual libraries often subscribed to services, such as NewsBank, as their source of microform content. Typically any given library might have several nationally relevant newspapers of record available from archive, locoregional coverage focused primarily on the newspapers of their own region, and some finite selection of others in between.

In the 21st century, use of microform formats for newspaper archive access in libraries has declined because the need for them has lessened owing to digital online archives. Newspaper archives are now available online in several ways, as follows:

- One way is that libraries still subscribe to services such as NewsBank but they now partake digitally rather than via microform media. Library account holders access the library's digital collection either on their own devices at home or on a PC at the library building.
- Another principal way is that any digital newspaper that a person subscribes to online as an individual customer (such as their home region's major paper, plus or minus any of the nationally popular digital papers) typically offers digital archive access for that paper specifically.
- Another principal way is that via publicly available archive services (such as Newspapers.com or NewspaperArchive.com), online archives of newspapers are available to any personal computer or smartphone (independently of any library card/account) and have fairly extensive and growing (albeit not exhaustive) archive collections. Online archives with access sold individually to the public at large typically offer limited use on a free trial basis (for casual users with occasional need), followed by a subscription fee for those users who have strong enough need or desire to search the archives on an ongoing basis (for example, over multiple months) that they decide to pay for a semiannual or annual subscription.

The National Digital Newspaper Program is another effort to achieve digital archives of American newspapers in ways that are affordable and accessible to the public.

Because of the aforementioned trends of digital archive accessibility, the cost of maintaining the machines and physical media of microform is increasingly forgone by library budgets, as the reduced need no longer justifies the expense. It has thus become unusual to find a microfilm or microfiche station still publicly available and operative in a public library or academic library.

A notable archive of print copies of American newspaper editions is the American Newspaper Repository, which was established in 1999 by a philanthropist who purchased the former American newspapers collection of the British Library. Since 2004 this archive resides at Duke University Libraries.

== Ownership ==
Ownership of newspapers in the United States includes smaller independent family owned groups like Mullen Newspaper Company, Adams Publishing, Wick Communications, and others, as well as large publicly owned media conglomerates like Gannett Company, The McClatchy Company, Lee Enterprises, and others, which combined publish a large percentage of the nation's papers.

The largest sixteen owners in 2022 by the total number of newspapers owned were:

1. Gannett (487 newspapers)
2. Tribune Publishing / Media News Group (190 newspapers)
3. Lee Enterprises (152 newspapers)
4. Adams Publishing Group (142 newspapers)
5. Paxton Media Group (120 newspapers)
6. Ogden Newspapers (101 newspapers)
7. CNHI (92 newspapers)
8. CherryRoad Media (71 newspapers)
9. Boone Newspapers (70 newspapers)
10. Community Media Group (49 newspapers)
11. Hearst Communications (48 newspapers)
12. Advance Publications (40 newspapers)
13. Black Press Media (40 newspapers)
14. Shaw Media (38 newspapers)
15. Horizon Publications (35 newspapers)
16. AIM Media (32 newspapers)

== Publication ==
Most general-purpose newspapers are either printed daily or weekly. They are in part advertising-driven, including classified advertisements, but also receive income from newsstand sales and subscriptions.

Major cities usually have alternative weeklies (New York City's Village Voice or Los Angeles' L.A. Weekly, for example), which rely entirely on advertising, and are free to the public. A newspaper meeting particular standards of circulation, including having a subscription or mailing list, is designated as a newspaper of record. With this designation, official notices may be published, such as fictitious business name announcements.

The number of daily newspapers in the United States has declined over the past half-century, according to Editor & Publisher, the trade journal of American newspapers. In particular, the number of evening newspapers has fallen by 50% since 1970, while morning editions and Sunday editions have grown.

For comparison, in 1950, there were 1,772 daily papers (and 1,450, or about 70%, of them were evening papers) while in 2000, there were 1,480 daily papers (and 766—or about half—of them were evening papers.

== See also ==
- List of newspapers in the United States
- List of American journalism awards
- Pulitzer Prize
