= Daily Reporter (Greenfield, Indiana) =

- Type: Daily newspaper
- Format: Broadsheet
- Owner: HD Media
- Editor: Anne Smith
- Founded: April 27, 1908, as Greenfield Daily Reporter
- Headquarters: 22 West New Road, Greenfield, Indiana 46140, United States
- Circulation: 7,900 Daily (as of 2012)
- OCLC number: 12940519
- Website: greenfieldreporter.com

The Daily Reporter is an American daily newspaper published in Greenfield, Indiana. It is owned by HD Media.

It covers the city of Greenfield and several nearby communities in Hancock County, Indiana. In addition to the daily newspaper, the Daily Reporter produces two weekly newspapers in Hancock County, the Fortville/McCordsville Reporter and the New Palestine Reporter. Home News also owns a third weekly in neighboring Madison County, The Times-Post.

== History ==
The Greenfield Daily Reporter was founded in 1908, although through a merger one year later it also incorporated the history of The Evening Star, founded August 1, 1904.

Robert N. Brown, whose grandfather had started The Republic in Columbus and who himself had founded the Daily Journal in Franklin, both in communities south of Indianapolis, purchased the Greenfield Daily Reporter in 1973, a year after the death of Dorothea Spencer, whose family had started the paper in 1908.

He said at the time that his goals for the newspaper would be "reflecting the total image of a community in news coverage, to serve community betterment, and to provide counsel in its editorials as public conscience."

In 1994 the Brown Family formed a partnership to create Home News Enterprises.

Home News expanded its holdings east of Indianapolis in June 2007, with the purchase of two weeklies in Madison County, the Lapel Post and The Pendleton Times, which it combined into the Times-Post of Pendleton.

In November 2015, Home News Enterprises announced that it was selling the Daily Reporter and its sister newspapers, online and commercial properties to AIM Media Indiana, an affiliate of AIM Media Texas.

In mid-August 2023, it was announced that the Daily Reporter, along with several of its sister newspapers, would see a reduction of print publication days starting Sept. 2, 2023. The paper is printed on Wednesdays and Saturdays with articles posted online daily.

In August 2026, the paper was sold to HD Media.
