= The Fighting Seabees =

1944 film by Edward Ludwig

- Theatrical poster
- Directed by: Edward Ludwig
- Written by: Borden Chase; Aeneas MacKenzie
- Produced by: Albert J. Cohen
- Starring: John Wayne; Susan Hayward; Dennis O'Keefe; William Frawley; Leonid Kinskey; J.M. Kerrigan; Grant Withers
- Cinematography: William Bradford
- Edited by: Richard L. Van Enger
- Music by: Walter Scharf; Roy Webb
- Production company: Republic Pictures
- Distributed by: Republic Pictures
- Release date: January 27, 1944 (Los Angeles)
- Running time: 100 minutes
- Country: United States
- Language: English
- Budget: $1.5 million or $720,000
- Box office: $1.9 million or $3.5 million

The Fighting Seabees is a 1944 American war film directed by Edward Ludwig and starring John Wayne and Susan Hayward. The supporting cast includes Dennis O'Keefe, William Frawley, Leonid Kinsky, Addison Richards and Grant Withers. The Fighting Seabees portrays a heavily fictionalized account of the dilemma that led to the creation of the U.S. Navy's "Seabees" in World War II. At the 17th Academy Awards, the film received a nomination for Best Scoring of a Dramatic or Comedy Picture for Walter Scharf and Roy Webb but the award went to Max Steiner for Since You Went Away.

== Plot ==
"Wedge" Donovan is a tough construction boss, building airstrips in the Pacific for the US Navy during World War II. He clashes with his liaison officer, Lieutenant Commander Robert Yarrow, over the fact that his men are not allowed to arm themselves against the Japanese.

When the enemy lands in force on the island, Donovan's men want to help fight. Donovan initially tries to dissuade them, but after a Japanese fighter kills or wounds several workers, he changes his mind and leads his men into the fray. This prevents Yarrow from springing a carefully devised trap that would have wiped out the invaders in a murderous machine gun crossfire, with minimal American losses. Instead, many of Donovan's men are killed unnecessarily.

As a result of this tragedy, Yarrow finally convinces the Navy to form Construction Battalions (CBs, or the more familiar "Seabees") with Donovan's assistance, despite their mutual romantic interest in war correspondent Constance Chesley. Donovan and many of his men enlist and receive formal military training.

The two men are teamed together on another island. The Japanese launch a major attack, which the Seabees barely manage to hold off, sometimes using heavy construction machinery such as bulldozers and a clamshell bucket.

When word reaches Donovan of another approaching enemy column, there are no sailors left to counter this new threat. In desperation, he rigs a bulldozer with explosives on its blade, intending to ram it into a petroleum storage tank. The plan works, sending a cascade of burning liquid into the path of the Japanese, who retreat in panic, right into the sights of waiting machine guns. However, Donovan is shot in the process and dies in the explosion.

== Cast ==
- John Wayne as Lt. Cmdr. "Wedge" Donovan
- Susan Hayward as Constance Chesley
- Dennis O'Keefe as Lt. Cmdr. Robert Yarrow
- William Frawley as Eddie Powers
- Leonid Kinskey as Johnny Novasky
- J.M. Kerrigan as Sawyer Collins
- Grant Withers as Whanger Spreckles
- Paul Fix as Ding Jacobs
- Ben Welden as Yump Lumkin
- William Forrest as Lt. Tom Kerrick
- Addison Richards as Capt. Joyce
- Jay Norris as Joe Brick
- Duncan Renaldo as Construction worker at party
- Wally Wales as Lt. Cmdr. Hood

(Note: USN Composite Squadron 68 aerial and rearming sequences featured Flight Leader Lt. Raymond Anderson.)

== Production ==
The Fighting Seabees had the biggest budget in Republic's history, $1.5 million. The film was completed in collaboration with the US Navy and the US Marine Corps, and took place on several bases in California (Camp Hueneme and Camp Pendleton), Virginia (Camp Peary) and Rhode Island (Camp Endicott). Principal photography took place from September 20 to early December 1943.

The bulk of the outdoor locations for The Fighting Seabees was filmed on the Iverson Movie Ranch in Chatsworth, Calif., widely considered to be the most heavily filmed outdoor filming location in the history of film and television. The production took over virtually the entire 500-acre location ranch for a period of time in 1943, constructing extensive sets on both the Upper Iverson and the Lower Iverson. Palm trees were brought in to transform Iverson's rocky Western landscape into a version of the Pacific islands where the film's action was set.

A massive landing strip was constructed on the Upper Iverson to simulate the takeoffs and landings of combat aircraft, as well as enemy bombing raids on the U.S.-built installation. On other parts of the ranch, Quonset huts, observation towers, large fuel tanks and other props were built, with the construction process in many cases filmed and featured as part of the film. Graphic scenes depicting tank battles, sniper attacks and hand-to-hand combat were filmed in the Iverson Gorge, Garden of the Gods and other sections of the movie ranch, in one of the largest productions in the ranch's history.

The aircraft in The Fighting Seabees were:

- Brewster F2A-3 Buffalo
- Douglas TBD Devastator
- Douglas SBD Dauntless
- Mitsubishi Ki-21
- Grumman F4F-3 Wildcat

== Reception ==
Film historian Leonard Maltin in Leonard Maltin's 2013 Movie Guide (2012) considered The Fighting Seabees, "action-packed" and "spirited". Film historian Alun Edwards in Brassey's Guide to War Films (2000) was more effusive in his evaluation: "With oodles of eulogies and even a Seabees song to sing, you can't fail to leave the Roxy dewey-eyed and with Stars and Stripes fluttering."

A positive review in the Rushville Republican included as highlights expertly scened battle sequences, tense dramatic interludes, moments of comedy contrasting with moments of suspense; concluding that this film is 'among the most spectacular ever filmed in Hollywood.' This review also drew attention to the fact that the 'Seabees' are less known to the public than most other branches of service, despite providing invaluable service: 'They are, quite literally, the "men in front of the man behind the gun." They land in combat zones ahead of the troops, and prepare docks, landing fields, barracks, everything that the invading troops require.'

== See also ==
- John Wayne filmography
- List of American films of 1944
