= Jackson County Banner =

- Overline from editorial page, 1871
- Type: Daily newspaper
- Format: Broadsheet
- Owner: AIM Media Indiana
- Founder: William Frysinger
- Editor: Aubrey Woods
- Founded: 1869
- Headquarters: Brownstown, IN
- ISSN: 1055-775X

The Jackson County Banner is a local newspaper serving Jackson County, Indiana, first published in April 1869. It is published semiweekly in Brownstown. The newspaper is owned by AIM Media Indiana, which purchased the company from Community Media Group in 2016.

The Jackson County Banner was founded by William Frysinger April 1, 1869, and sold seven months later to Henry M. Beadle. Less than a year later, Beadle sold the newspaper back to Frysinger. This newspaper went back and forth among owners until 1896 when Frysinger's widow inherited the paper after his death. In 1898 the editor of the paper, Andrew J. Brodhecker, bought the business and later passed it down to his sons. By 1973 a family by the name of Pesta owned the newspaper and changed it from a weekly newspaper to a semiweekly newspaper on April 15, 1974.

In August 2025, Jackson County Banner's longtime website domain was acquired by The Baltimore Banner.
