= Journal Review =

Newspaper in Crawfordsville, Indiana, USA

The Journal Review
- Type: Daily newspaper
- Owner(s): PTS, Inc.
- Founder: H. Foster Fudge
- Publisher: Shawn Storie
- Editor: Tina McGrady
- City: Crawfordsville, Indiana, USA
- Circulation: 6,000
- Website: journalreview.com

The Journal Review is a newspaper based in Crawfordsville, Indiana, USA with a circulation of 6,000. It is a daily except Sunday paper and reports national news and news for the surrounding Montgomery County area in print and online. The paper was founded in 1929 as an independent daily from the merger of the Journal and the Review. This small town newspaper has chronicled multiple notable events.

== Notable Achievements ==
In 1879 The Crawfordsville Journal named its only nineteenth century female associate editor, Mary Hannah Krout. She was associate editor for 3 years.

The Crawfordsville Weekly Journal published in 1890 an obituary for Fisher Dougherty, an Abolitionist whose home was a station on the Underground Railroad in Crawfordsville.

In 1891 The Crawfordsville Journal reported on the phenomenon known as the Crawfordsville Monster

In 1910 The Crawfordsville Daily Journal reported on Theodore Roosevelt stopping to campaign in Crawfordsville.

In 1918 The Crawfordsville Daily Journal reported on a city-wide parade ex-president William H. Taft lead to officially open a local Bank.

== History ==
- 1929 Founded as the Crawfordsville Journal and Review with the merger of the two Crawfordsville papers. Owned by H. Foster Fudge

Crawfordsville Journal History

- 1894-1929 Crawfordsville Journal published by Journal Co.
- 1894-1894 Crawfordsville Daily Journal published by Journal Co.
- 1894-188? The Daily Journal published by T.H.B. McCain
- 1886-1887 The Daily Dispatch

Crawfordsville Review History

- 1908-1929 The Crawfordsville Review publisher Sine None
- 1900-1908 The Daily News-Review published by S.M. Coffman, formed by merger of the Daily Argus and the New Review

Daily Argus History

- 1885-1900 The Daily Argus News published S.M. Coffman
- 1883-1885 The Crawfordsville Evening Argus published Robt. B. Willson [sic]
- 1882-1883 Evening Argus published by Thos. C. Pursel

New Review History

- 1899-1900 The New Review published by Review Co.
- 187?-188? Weekly Review
- 187?-187? Crawfordsville Review published by J.L. Miller
- 1861-187? Crawfordsville Weekly Review published by Charles H. Bowen
- 1854-1861 Crawfordsville Review published by Charles H. Bowen and B.F. Stover
- 1841-1854 The Review published Engle and Masterson
