= The News-Gazette (Winchester, Indiana) =

Indiana local newspaper

- Type: Twice-weekly newspaper
- Format: Broadsheet
- Owner(s): The Graphic Printing Company
- Publisher: Ray Cooney
- Editor: Ray Cooney
- Founded: 1976
- Headquarters: Winchester, Indiana
- ISSN: 1040-3116
- OCLC number: 13641320
- Website: winchesternewsgazette.com

The News-Gazette is a local newspaper serving Randolph County, Indiana, as well as parts of Ohio. It is owned by The Graphic Printing Company of Portland, Indiana. Its publisher is Ray Cooney. It is published bi-weekly on Tuesdays and Thursdays.

The Graphic Printing Company bought the newspaper from Community Media Group on May 1, 2023. During the 1990s, the paper changed hands multiple times, being bought by Park Communications in 1988, which sold it in 1994 to Donald Tomlin and Gary Knapp. Knapp and Tomlin sold it in turn to Media General.

== See also ==
- List of newspapers in Indiana
