= Madison Courier =

Newspaper published in Madison

The Madison Courier
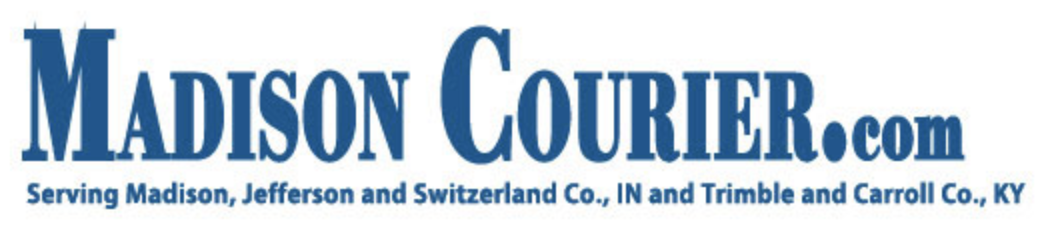
- Type: Daily newspaper
- Founded: 1837; 188 years ago
- Language: English
- City: Madison, Indiana
- Country: United States
- Circulation: 9,500
- OCLC number: 12442598
- Website: madisoncourier.com

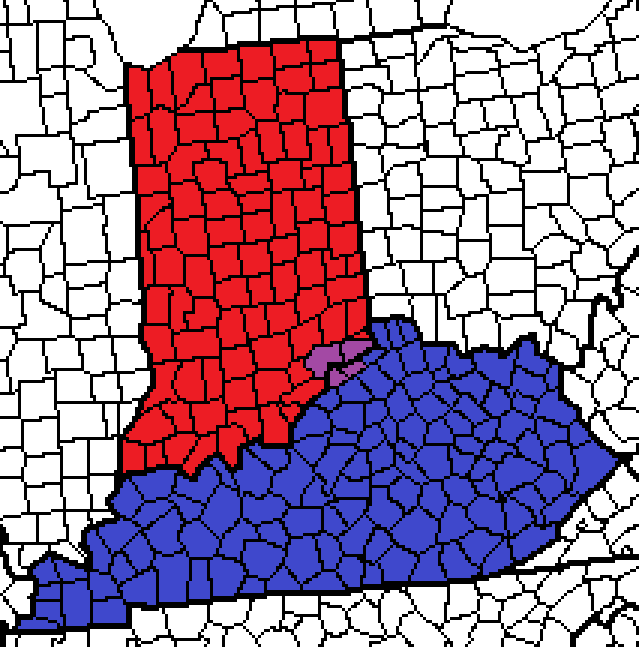
Distribution of the Madison Courier (purple) in Indiana (red) and Kentucky (blue)

The Madison Courier is a local newspaper located in Madison, Indiana that also services Jefferson and Switzerland Counties in Indiana, plus Trimble and Carroll Counties in Kentucky. The newspaper has a daily print circulation of 9,500 subscribers with over 20,000 readers. They also have a website where they upload e-editions of their newspapers.

== History ==
The newspaper was founded in 1837, making it the second oldest newspaper in the state of Indiana behind just the Vincennes Sun-Commercial. The newspaper is self-published and has been owned by the same family since 1849.

The newspaper has changed its name several times throughout its existence. Most recently in 1892, it took its current name when it was renamed by its owner Don R. Wallis. Before that it had been known as the:

- Madison Daily Courier (1869–1892)
- The Madison Daily Evening Courier (1865–1869)
- Madison Daily Courier (1863–1865)
- The Daily Evening Courier (1855–1863)
- Madison Daily Courier (1849–1855)
- Madison Weekly Courier (1848–1849)
- Madison Courier (1847–1848)
- Madison Weekly Courier (1845–1847)
- Madison Courier (1837–1845)

=== The Evening Star ===
The Evening Star was a rival newspaper in Madison that was founded in 1876 by J.D. Simpson. It would be published daily until 1884 when it would be purchased and merged with the Courier.

== See also ==
- List of newspapers in Indiana
