= The Pilot News =

- Type: Daily newspaper
- Format: Broadsheet
- Owner(s): Horizon Publications
- Publisher: Cindy Stockton
- Editor: James Master
- Founded: 1851
- Political alignment: Republican
- Headquarters: 218 N. Michigan; Plymouth, Indiana 46563
- Circulation: 4,435
- OCLC number: 8807950
- Website: thepilotnews.com

The Pilot News is a six-day-a-week daily newspaper serving Plymouth, Indiana, United States, and the surrounding area, with a circulation of 4,435. Covering local news and sports both online and in print, it delivers Monday through Saturday throughout Marshall County.

It has five sister papers. These include three weekly papers delivered each Thursday: Heartland News, delivered in the towns of Nappanee, Wakarusa, Bremen, Bourbon; Culver Citizen in the town of Culver; and The Leader throughout Starke County. There are also two shopper products: The Shopper, delivered Saturday/Sunday throughout Marshall County; and The Review, delivered Tuesday throughout Starke County.

The Valparaiso Vidette Messenger and the Rushville Republican published stories on The Pilot News' 100th birthday on July 31, 1951, detailing how it was one of only twelve daily newspapers in Indiana when it was first established.

The Pilot was founded in 1851 by John Q. Howell. It had the odd quirk of publishing its first issue as number 13, which was explained by Howell as an effort to retain continuity of numbering with his previous paper, the Rochester Republican.

The Pilot announced its politics as Jacksonian, but pledged to "never descend to that abuse of our opponents in Opinion which is too often resorted to by partizan Presses." Howell moved his paper form Rochester to Plymouth when some townspeople in Plymouth offered him $200 to relocate.

The Pilot has since gone through multiple owners and many different names, and ultimately switched from being a Democratic paper to a Republican one. It returned to its original name after the merger of the Plymouth Pilot and the Plymouth News in 1947. Under a unique arrangement, the Republican Pilot initially published a copy under the News name and masthead with all the articles the same, but the editorial content from a Democratic perspective.

The paper was sold to Park Newspapers in March 1977. In 2003, Horizon Publications purchased it from Community Newspaper Holdings. It had a location sales volume of $1,702,000 as of September 2018.
