= The Times of Northwest Indiana =

Newspaper based in Munster, Indiana, US

The Times

- The September 12, 2021 front page of The Times
- Type: Daily newspaper
- Format: Broadsheet
- Owner: Lee Enterprises
- Publisher: Chris White
- Editor: Joe Hosey
- Founded: 1906
- Headquarters: 601 45th Ave. Munster, IN 46321; United States
- Circulation: 42,413 Daily; 43,416 Sunday (as of 2023)
- OCLC number: 42819936
- Website: nwitimes.com

The Times of Northwest Indiana (NWI) is a daily newspaper headquartered in Munster, Indiana. It is the second-largest newspaper in Indiana, behind only The Indianapolis Star.

== History ==
The paper was founded on June 18, 1906, as The Lake County Times. Its founder, Simon McHie, was a native of a small town along the Niagara River in Canada. In 1933, the name was changed to The Hammond Times, and it became an afternoon paper serving Hammond, Whiting, and East Chicago. In May 1962, the McHie family sold the publication to Robert S. Howard of Howard Publications. The paper expanded to all of northwest Indiana in 1967 and dropped Hammond from its masthead to become simply The Times. Offices were moved to Munster in 1989, and the paper began morning delivery and began printing different editions based on distribution region. The Howard papers were bought in April 2002 by Lee Enterprises.

== Distribution ==
The Times prints different editions based on delivery region. The three major news regions are:

- Munster (northern Lake County and adjacent suburbs in Illinois such as Calumet City)
- Crown Point (southern Lake County)
- Valparaiso (Porter and LaPorte counties)

The Times' main office is located in Munster. There are bureau offices in Valparaiso and Indianapolis.

== See also ==
- List of newspapers in Indiana
