= The Paper of Montgomery County =

- Type: Daily newspaper
- Founded: November 24, 2004
- Headquarters: Montgomery County, Indiana
- Website: thepaper24-7.com

The Paper of Montgomery County is a daily newspaper in Montgomery County, Indiana. Its first issue was dated November 24, 2004; The Paper currently publishes Monday-Saturday, and is delivered to subscribers through the U.S. Postal Service. In 2005, The Paper acquired The Weekly of West Central Indiana. On Tuesdays, the publication is free of charge and circulated more widely, under a joint "The Paper/Weekly" flag.

The Paper was conceived by Gaildene Hamilton, who for many years served as editor of the Journal Review, the county's other daily newspaper. Hamilton did not get to see the first issue go to press; she died suddenly in July 2004.

The Paper is owned by a group of 10 local business people, including publisher Tim Timmons.

"The Paper of Montgomery County Indiana is a daily newspaper devoted to promoting the people and events of Montgomery County," according to the mission statement on its website. The Paper also partners with Indianapolis television station WTHR for news-gathering.

== See also ==
List of newspapers in Indiana
