= RMS Homeric =

Ocean Liner

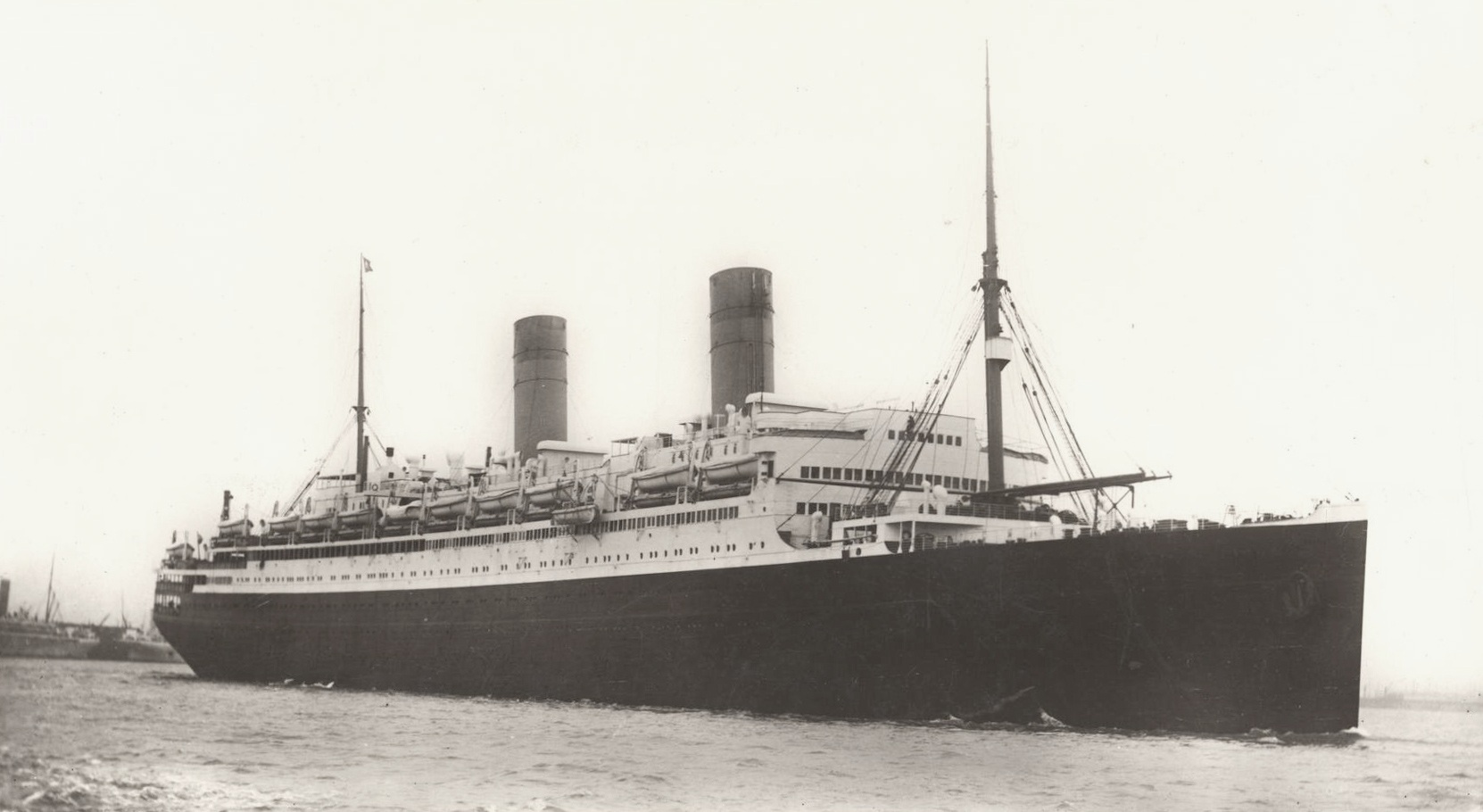
- RMS Homeric

History

United Kingdom
- Name: RMS Homeric
- Owner: White Star Line 1922-1934 Cunard-White Star Line 1934-1935
- Operator: White Star Line 1922-1934 Cunard-White Star Line 1934-1935
- Port of registry: Liverpool, England
- Route: Southampton–New York
- Ordered: April 1912
- Builder: F. Schichau; Danzig, Germany
- Yard number: 891
- Laid down: 1912
- Launched: 17 December 1913 as Columbus for North German Lloyd
- Christened: January 1922 as Homeric
- Completed: 1921
- Maiden voyage: 15 February 1922
- In service: 1922
- Out of service: 25 September 1935
- Renamed: Columbus to Homeric, 1922
- Refit: 1927
- Home port: Liverpool, England
- Nickname(s): "Home at sea"
- Fate: Scrapping commenced in 1936, finished by 1938

General characteristics
- Class & type: Columbus-class ocean liner
- Type: Ocean liner
- Tonnage: 34,351 GRT, 18,058 NRT
- Length: 774 ft (236 m)
- Beam: 82.3 ft (25.1 m)
- Propulsion: Twin propellers
- Speed: Before refit: 18 knots (33 km/h; 21 mph) After refit: 19.5 knots (36.1 km/h; 22.4 mph)
- Capacity: 2,145 passengers: 750 First Class, 545 Second Class, 850 Third Class
- Crew: 780
- Notes: Sister ship to SS Columbus (1924)

RMS Homeric, originally launched as Columbus, was an ocean liner built for Norddeutscher Lloyd and launched in 1913 at the F. Schichau yard in Danzig, Germany (now Gdańsk, Poland). Columbus was ceded to Great Britain in 1919 as part of German war reparations. She was sold to the White Star Line in 1920, which named her Homeric. Her sister ship Hindenburg remained in German ownership and was renamed Columbus. Homeric was operated by White Star from 1922 to 1935.

== History ==
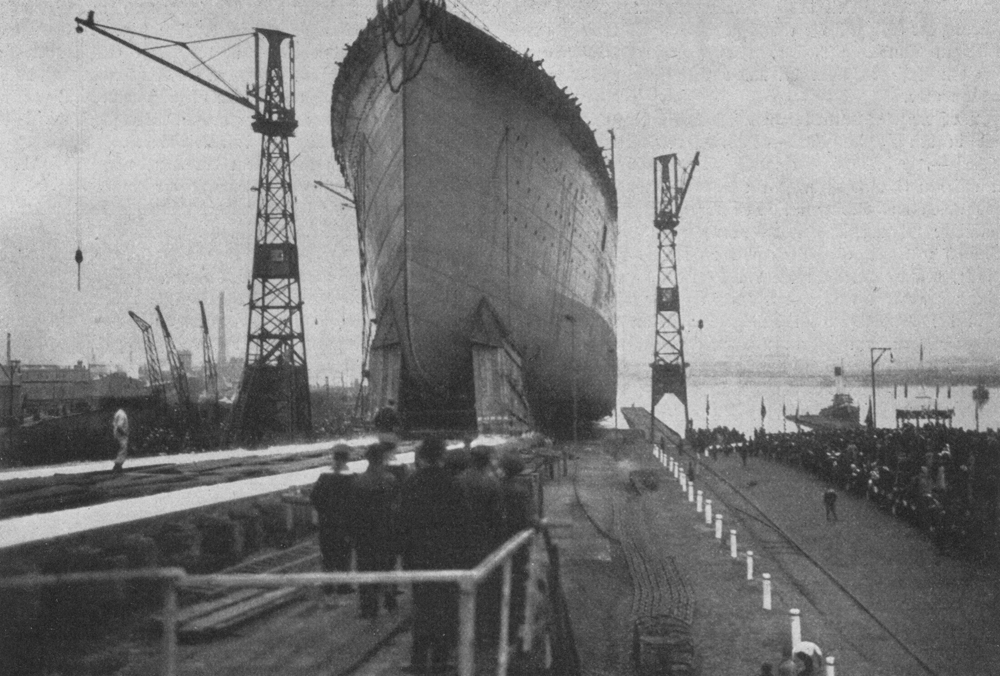
Columbus being launched in 1913 at Danzig

The White Star Line originally planned for its three Olympic-class liners, Olympic, Titanic and Britannic, to operate a weekly transatlantic express service. However, Titanic was lost on her maiden voyage after striking an iceberg in 1912, and Britannic was lost in the First World War after striking a naval mine in the Aegean in 1916. Another of the line’s express ships, the 17,000-ton Oceanic of 1899, was also lost during war service in 1914. When Olympic re-entered civilian service in 1920, she lacked any suitable running mates. Under the terms of the Treaty of Versailles which entitled Britain to war reparations, White Star looked to obtain some large German liners which had been under construction during the war but were left unfinished. One was the 56,000-ton Bismarck, the third and largest of Albert Ballin's great Imperator-class trio, left unfinished at the Blohm & Voss Shipyard. This was equally sold to the White Star Line and Cunard Line and renamed Majestic. Another was the 34,000-ton Columbus at F. Schichau in Danzig.

Contemporary illustration comparing the size of the Columbus to famous landmarks.

Launched on 17 December 1913, Columbus was the first of two vessels ordered by Norddeutscher Lloyd (North German Lloyd) for their Bremerhaven to New York service. The launch is imagined in Günter Grass's novel The Tin Drum. At 34,000 tons, Columbus was, at the time, the largest twin-screw ship powered by reciprocating engines in the world. She was built for a relatively modest service speed of just a shade over 18 knots (33 km/h; 21 mph). White Star Line purchased the unfinished Columbus in 1920, and renamed her Homeric. The ship was completed and entered service two years later.

In 1920 construction was resumed under the watchful eye of officials sent down from Harland and Wolff, but work was slow, plagued by material shortages and a workforce that had no ambition to finish the ship only to hand it over to the British. Finally completed in late 1921, the Homeric was handed over by a reluctant builder. The new liner performed remarkably well on her trials; she was noted for her stability in rough weather, a characteristic that would earn her many loyal passengers.

=== Interiors ===
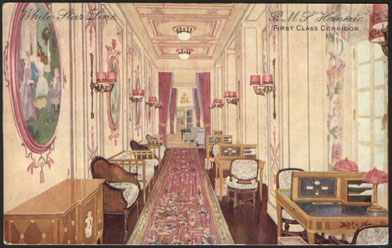
Homeric's First Class corridor

Except for the First-Class dining saloon of the Homeric, which was located on D-Deck, all the First-Class public rooms were located on the boat deck in one long, continuous sequence. At the forward end, beneath the navigating bridge one deck above, was a drawing room with plate glass windows offering views of the bow and the sea beyond. After the drawing room came a reading and writing room, followed by the lounge, music room, smoking room, and a glass-enclosed veranda at the aft-end of the deck. The sides of each room offered "an unbroken vista" of the full 340-foot length of this sequence of rooms.

The largest of the main suite of rooms was the lounge, 94 ft. long and 47 ft. wide, with a 20-foot-high vaulted skylight at its center. The lounge was dominated by two large paintings at each end, one of Columbus landing in the New World, and the other of Columbus being received by Queen Isabella and Ferdinand II. Between the windows were fluted columns with gilded Doric capitals, and the room was furnished in an assortment of styles and upholstery. At the center of the room the carpet could be removed to reveal a circular dance floor with room for 300 dancers. The First-Class dining room, located on D-Deck, was overlooked by a gallery and featured "an inverted dome of crystal pendants...centered in a ceiling of white and gold." The Smoking Room was decorated in the Old Dutch style, with floor-to-ceiling walnut paneling and a carved, white-painted ceiling. On either side of the room were 18-foot-high bow windows hung with buff and olive-colored silk curtains. The furniture was overstuffed and upholstered in Morocco leather and wool tapestry.

Other amenities on board included 3 elevators, 2 for First Class and 1 for Second, a gymnasium, hairdressing salon, typewriting room, and dark room. Children had their own playroom and dining saloon, and there was a covered deck for sports.

=== Atlantic service ===
White Star Line advert for the Homeric.

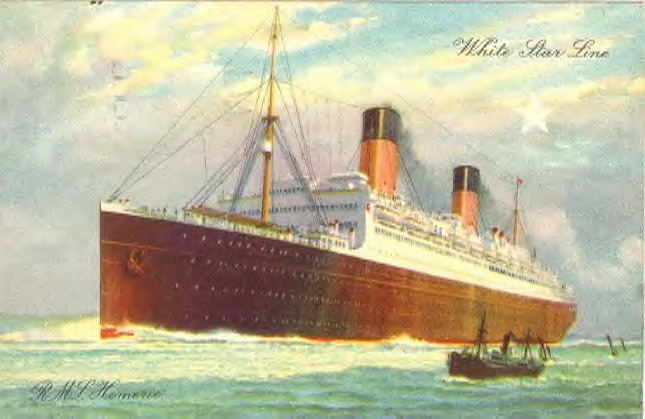
Postcard made in 1929 or 1930

Resplendent in her White Star livery, the newly completed Homeric arrived in Southampton 21 January 1922, and on 15 February 1922, Homeric departed Southampton on her maiden voyage to New York. She joined the Olympic on the Atlantic and in May, Bismarck successfully transformed into the flagship Majestic would arrive and complete the three-ship express service, operating in direct competition against the rival Cunard Line's trio of Mauretania, Aquitania, and Berengaria (the former German Imperator).

Settling quickly into her Atlantic routine, the Homeric proved to be a popular ship for White Star, although her speed became a major concern for the line, for at 18 knots (33 km/h; 21 mph), the Homeric could not keep pace with her fleet-mates, Olympic and Majestic, both of which had a service speed above 21 knots (39 km/h; 24 mph) making it a nightmare to maintain a weekly schedule. At the conclusion of her second season, in October 1923, Homeric was removed from service for an extended winter overhaul, and her boilers were converted to burn fuel oil instead of coal, this allowed the number of engine room staff to be reduced from 300 to around 100. The extensive re-working would require a full eight months at the shipyard, but on 19 April 1924, she was returned to service, proving to be slightly faster, averaging 19.5 knots (36.1 km/h; 22.4 mph). Still, even at 19.5 knots she could not be successfully matched with the Olympic and Majestic. Nevertheless, the increase did reduce one day from her average transatlantic voyage.

On one voyage in August 1924 Homeric arrived in New York late after steaming through a hurricane off the United States East Coast; She had been hit by an 80-foot (24 m) rogue wave which injured seven people, smashed numerous windows and portholes, carried away one of the lifeboats, and snapped chairs and other fittings from their fastenings. Aboard was Rudolph Novak, a 1924 Summer Olympics gymnast, who was reportedly nearly swept overboard.

On 19 April 1925 Homeric received the distress call 'Now very danger. Come quick' from the Japanese freighter Raifuku Maru which was listing dangerously in heavy seas and taking on water. Homeric was 70 miles (110 km) away and sped to Raifuku Maru's position at 20 knots. However when she arrived, Raifuku Maru was listing at a 30 degree angle, and the rough seas prevented Homeric from getting close enough to rescue any of the stricken ship's crew, who had attempted unsuccessfully to get away in their lifeboats, which were smashed by the rough seas. Homeric's crew and passengers watched helplessly as the Japanese freighter sank with all thirty eight of her crew. This incident became controversial at the time: When Homeric reached New York, several passengers spoke to the press accusing Homeric's crew of not making enough effort to rescue the crew of the stricken ship. The Japanese press even accused the Homeric's crew of racism. These accusations were denied strenuously.

Built with the steerage trade in mind, Homeric had a huge portion of her accommodations devoted to immigrants, and when the United States curtailed the flow of foreign settlers in the mid-1920s the Homeric was particularly hit hard. Her original passenger capacity was given as 529 First class, 487 Second class and 1,750 Third class. Some of her transatlantic crossings began to lose money as early as 1926, during which year some of her better third-class accommodation was regraded as the newly introduced Tourist class. From 1927 the ship was sent on cruises around the Mediterranean and Caribbean during the slack season. In 1930, second class was abolished and renamed Tourist class; effectively the second class and the best third class cabins had been renamed in an attempt to make the ship's accommodation more appealing to potential clientele. From 1930 her capacity was given as 523 First class, 841 Tourist class, and 314 Third class, reflecting the decline of the steerage trade.

By the early 1930s the Great Depression was hitting the Atlantic shipping hard, with passenger numbers well down, there were no longer enough passengers to support a three-ship express service, and so it was decided to remove Homeric from the Atlantic service altogether and devote her to cruising full time. On 10 June 1932 Homeric departed New York for Southampton for the last time. Her career on the Atlantic was short-lived, as she only provided transatlantic service for ten years.

=== Cruising service ===
Cruising from British ports to the Mediterranean, the Homeric was one of the first liners to be used exclusively as a cruise ship, she handled this position brilliantly, and soon was well established in the cruising industry. To make her better suited to her new role Homeric was refitted with an outdoor swimming pool and lido deck. Although the Homeric never succumbed to any great disaster, she was involved in one minor incident while at anchor off Tenerife on 28 September 1932. Cia Transmediterrania's small Isla de Tenerife failed to steer while circling the Homeric, slamming into the side of the ship near the bow. Luckily, the larger ship was not badly damaged and her cruise continued.

=== Demise ===
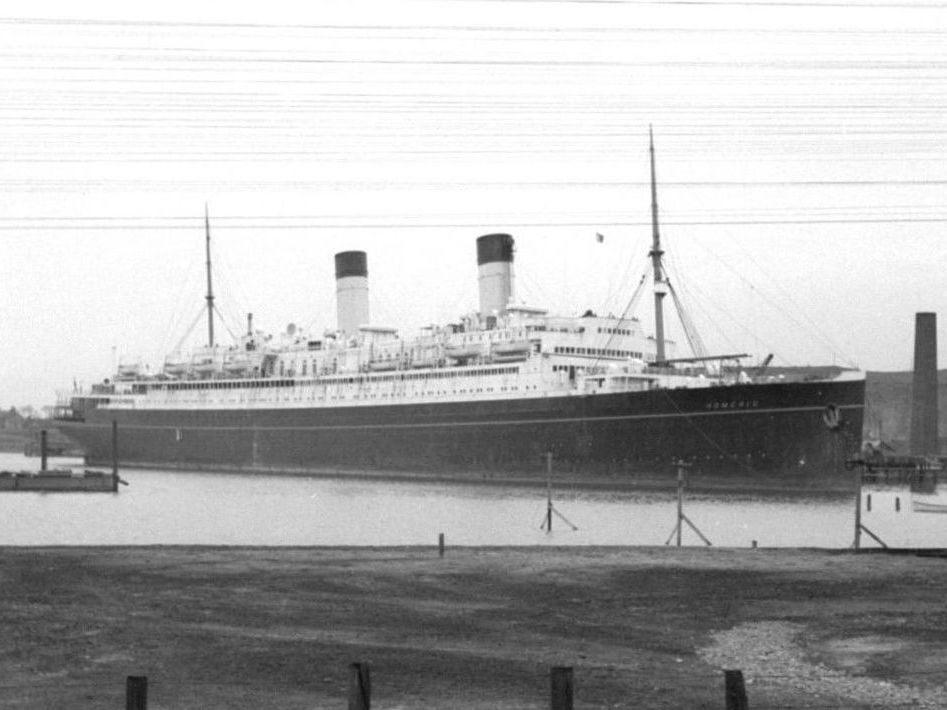
Homeric at Inverkeithing, awaiting scrapping

Despite Homeric's success as a cruise ship, White Star's financial situation worsened in the early 1930s, and the Homeric's future became increasingly grim. In 1934, White Star merged with their rival Cunard, and the merged company began rationalising their fleet and disposing of surplus ships, Homeric was earmarked for disposal, however she was given a reprieve due to a well booked cruising season. In July 1935, Homeric participated in King George V's Silver Jubilee fleet review, a prestigious honour. Her final voyage as a cruise ship came to an end on 25 September 1935, after which she was laid up at Ryde, Isle of Wight pending disposal. There was some talk of her original German owners Norddeutscher Lloyd purchasing her in order to run alongside her sister, the renamed Columbus which was still in German ownership. However, this came to nothing when in February 1936 she was sold for scrapping. Homeric sailed into Inverkeithing, Scotland for demolition on 27 February 1936.

== Remains ==
Despite her scrapping, many of her interior furnishings survive to this day. The former Rex Cinema in Stonehouse, Scotland preserves some of the Homeric's grand interior. Although the building is not generally open to the public as it is now used at a storage facility on some occasions visitors are allowed in by the owners. It was recently featured on episode 2, series 9 of the BBC program Timeshift about the Golden Age of Liners. Most of the interior of the first floor now remains intact as part of the Balgeddie House Hotel Glenrothes, including the floorboards which are now the floor boards of the main lounge.
