= The Village Sampler =

Defunct local newspaper in Indiana, United States

The Village Sampler was a monthly newspaper that served the Broad Ripple Village community, a neighborhood located at the bend of the White River on the north side of Indianapolis, Indiana. The community was named after a poem by Hoosier poet James Whitcomb Riley titled "Broad Ripple". Publisher and journalist Lillian Rose Barcio founded The Village Sampler, served as the newspaper's editor-in-chief, and along with her husband, Bernard F. Barcio, was a founding partner of its publishing company, BLB Enterprises, Inc.

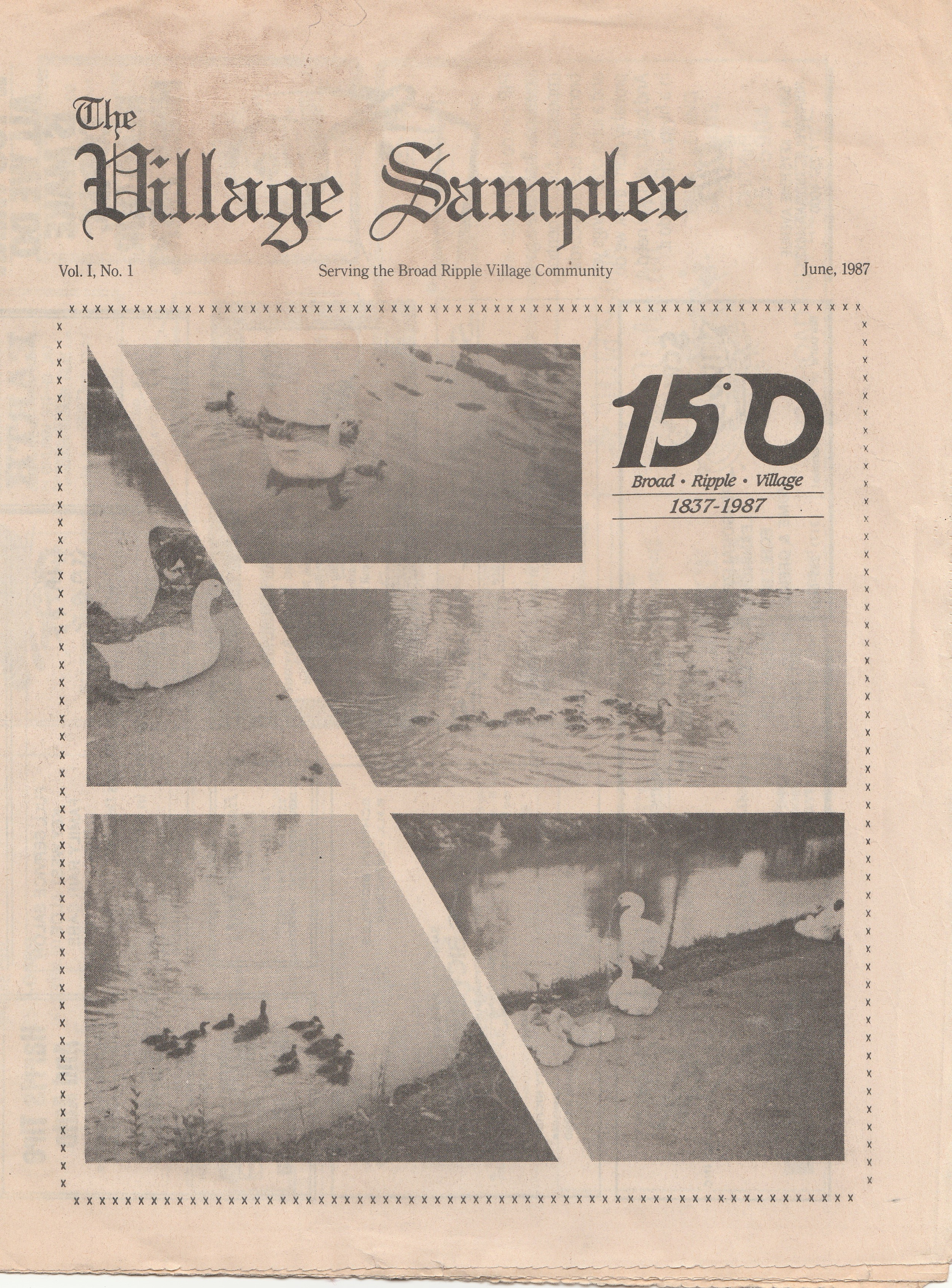
Front cover of Volume 1, Issue 1 of The Village Sampler

== History ==
Lillian Rose Barcio worked as a publications assistant at Butler University, where she received free tuition as part of her employment. Barcio utilized this benefit to return to school at age 50 and earn her journalism degree. After graduating, utilizing her degree and her previous publishing experience, Barcio founded the Village Sampler Newspaper and became its editor in chief. The first issue of the Village Sampler was published in June 1987. The newspaper continued operating until December 1998, when it ceased publication due to Barcio's declining health. Throughout its run, The Village Sampler took special care to document the history of Indianapolis, publishing hundreds of articles and interviews on the subject with a special focus on the Broad Ripple community, where the paper was published out of Barcio's basement in a house at 6026 Indianola Avenue. A complete set of back issues is in the permanent collection of the central branch of the Indianapolis Public Library.

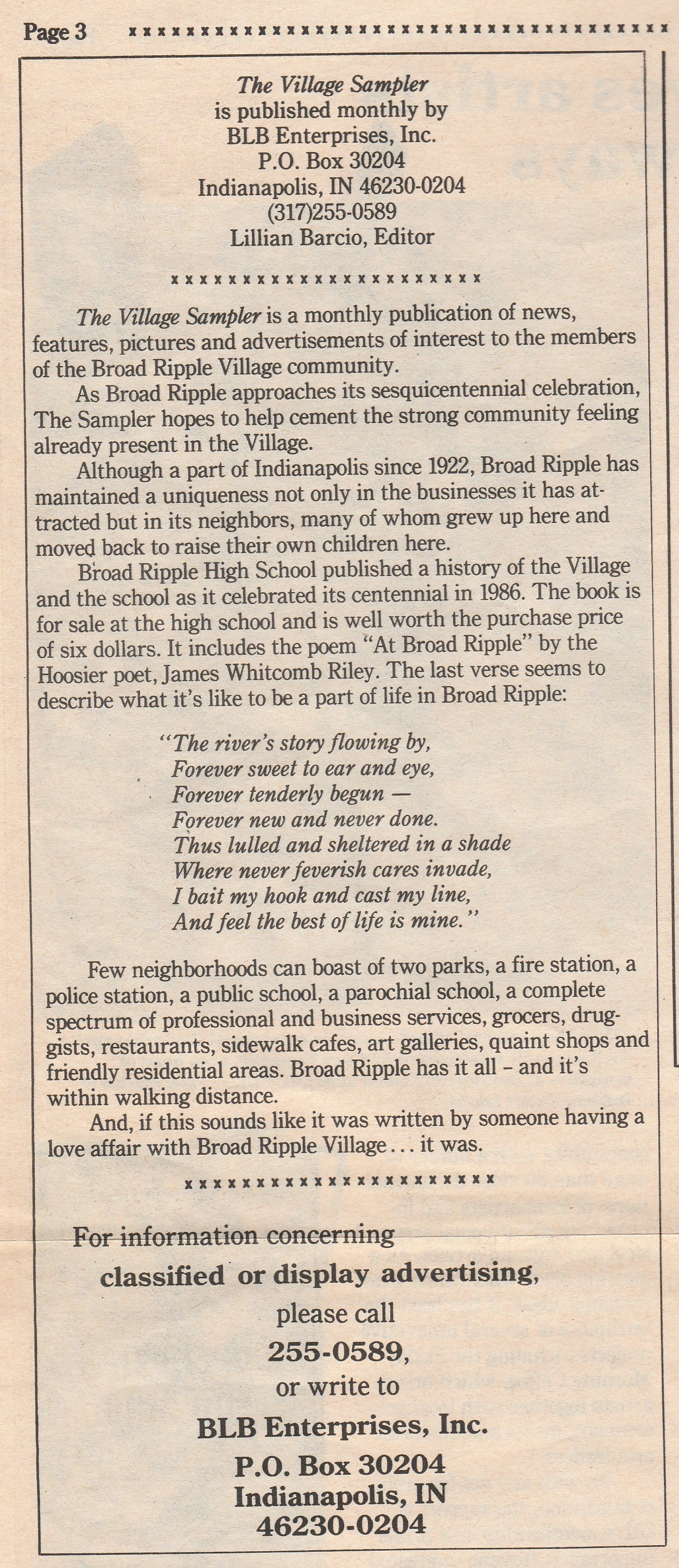
Masthead printed on page two of Volume 1, Issue 1 of The Village Sampler newspaper
