= The Regional News =

- Type: Weekly newspaper
- Format: Broadsheet
- Owner(s): Kiel Media
- Publisher: Justin Kiel
- Editor: Kelly Kiel
- Founded: 1915
- Headquarters: 16 E. Main Street; LaCrosse, Indiana 46348; United States
- Circulation: 650 Weekly
- Price: $0.75 Weekly $35 ($50 out of county) Annually
- Website: www.kielmedia.com

The Regional News is a weekly newspaper that began publishing on July 22, 1915. It covers the southern portion of La Porte County, Indiana, United States, and is currently owned by Kiel Media.

== History ==
The Regional News was first printed as the LaCrosse Sentinel on July 22, 1915, by Irving D. Young. Mr. Young was an editor, a publisher, type setter, printer, and a rural mail carrier. With the help of his brother, Leonard, Young operated the publication until March 15, 1934. At that time the paper was sold to Burette E. Slater of Westville, and having more modern facilities, the paper was then printed at Westville, while an office was still maintained in LaCrosse.

In 1955, the Sentinel was merged with the Wanatah Mirror and the name of the newspaper was changed to The Regional News.

On October 28, 1961, the LaCrosse office was moved to a new building located at 16 E. Main Street. The rear of the building was rented to the LaCrosse Public Library in December 1961. Four years later, the library purchased the entire building.

In the early 2000s the newspaper was purchased by Galen Armstrong. On March 13, 2014, ownership of The Regional News as well as the Westville Indicator were transferred to Kiel Media. In June 2015 the owners purchased back the old Regional News office from the LaCrosse Public Library, which had since moved to a new building.
