= Raifuku Maru =

Japanese cargo ship, 1918–1925

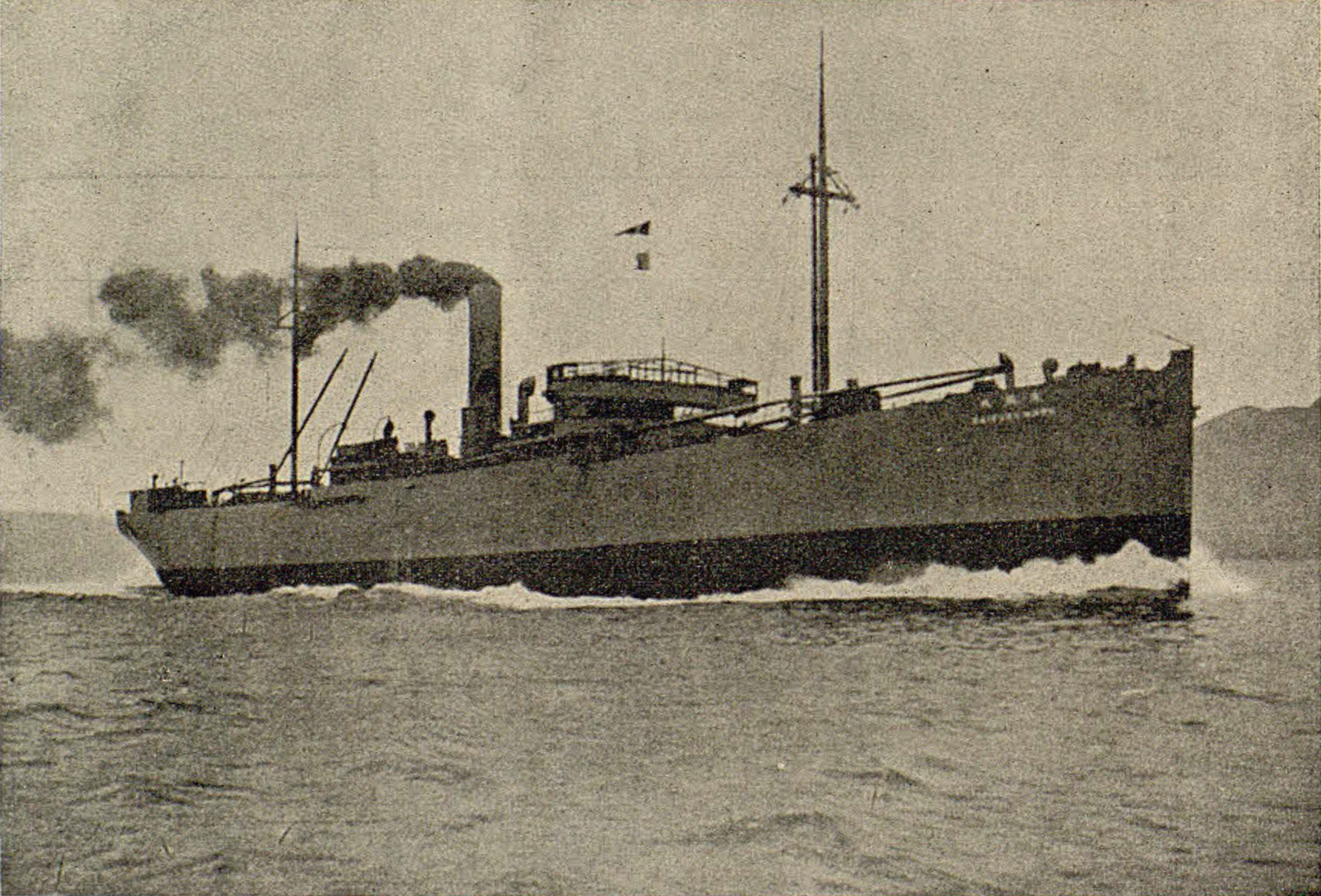
- Raifuku Maru

History

Japan
- Name: Raifuku Maru
- Owner: Kawasaki Kisen Kaisha, Ltd.
- Port of registry: Kobe, Japan
- Builder: Kawasaki Dockyard, Kobe
- Yard number: 427
- Completed: November 1918
- Identification: code letters RFBQ
- Fate: Sank 21 April 1925

General characteristics
- Tonnage: 5,867 GRT; 4,259 NRT
- Length: 385.0 ft (117.3 m)
- Beam: 151.0 ft (46.0 m)
- Depth: 36.0 ft (11.0 m)
- Decks: 2
- Installed power: 1 × triple-expansion engine; 440 NHP
- Propulsion: 1 × screw

Front page of The New York Times, April 23, 1925, detailing the sinking of Raifuku Maru

SS Raifuku Maru (来福丸 (Kyūjitai: 來福丸), Raifuku Maru) was a Japanese cargo ship. On 21 April 1925, she sank in a heavy storm in the Atlantic Ocean with the loss of her entire crew of 38.

== Construction and service ==
Raifuku Maru was built at the Kawasaki Dockyard in Kobe, Japan, in 1918. A Dai-ichi Taifuku Maru-class steam cargo ship, she was completed in November 1918. Kawasaki Kisen Kaisha, Ltd. owned her.

== Loss ==
Raifuku Maru left Boston, Massachusetts, on 18 April 1925 bound for Hamburg, Germany. On 21 April, she sailed into a heavy storm, and her cargo of wheat began to shift, causing her to take on an increasing list to one side. The White Star Line passenger ship RMS Homeric and several other ships received the following signal from the Japanese ship's wireless telegraphist, Masao Hiwatari: "Now very danger! Come quick!" Despite Hiwatari's broken English, it was clear that the ship was in trouble. Homeric and the British ship King Alexander tried to reach Raifuku Maru but were unable to get close enough to rescue any of her crew due to the rough seas. The ship listed at a 30-degree angle and sank with all hands as Homeric's crew and passengers watched. Homeric sent the following message to the Camperdown Signal Station: "OBSERVED STEAMER RAIFUKU MARU SINK IN LAT 4143N LONG 6139W [41°43′N 061°39′W] REGRET UNABLE TO SAVE ANY LIVES." Several ships tried to find bodies or survivors from the ship in the days after the sinking, but found none.

The incident was controversial at the time; when Homeric arrived in New York, several of the passengers publicly accused the crew of Homeric of not making enough effort to save Raifuku Maru's crew. This was taken up by the Japanese government, who accused the British captains of racism for not saving Raifuku Maru′s crew. Homeric's crew and the White Star Line strenuously denied this, arguing that they had made every effort to rescue the crew.

== Myths and legends ==
Several early reports of the incident, including those of the Associated Press, claimed that Hiwatari sent a frantic message reading "Danger like dagger now!" The source of this quote is unknown, since it isn't included in radio logs or official records of the incident, but appears in many early accounts of Raifuku Maru's sinking. Divorced of its original context, the "dagger" comment became the basis for a popular legend that the ship disappeared without a trace after sending the message. Later writers speculated over what the "dagger" was (with waterspouts and UFOs frequently blamed), and the incident became remembered as a genuine mystery of the sea. Popular writers on the Bermuda Triangle, specifically Charles Berlitz and Richard Winer, propagated the myth of the ship's "mysterious" sinking.

== Newspaper sources ==
- "Japanese Ships Sinks With A Crew Of 38; Liners Unable To Aid" The New York Times, April 22, 1925.
- "Passengers Differ On Homeric Effort To Save Sinking Ship" The New York Times, April 23, 1925.
- "Homeric Captain Upheld By Skippers" The New York Times, April 24, 1925.
- "Liner Is Battered In Rescue Attempt" The New York Times, April 25, 1925.
