= The Benton Review =

- The 15 November 2006 front page of The Benton Review
- Type: Weekly newspaper
- Format: Broadsheet
- Owner: Hoosier Media Group
- Publisher: Don Hurd
- Editor: Clayton Doty
- Founded: 1875
- Headquarters: 209 E 5th Street; Fowler, IN 47944; United States

The Benton Review is a weekly newspaper serving Benton, Jasper, Newton, Tippecanoe, Warren and White counties in Indiana. It began July 1875 as the Benton Democrat; by 1902 it was bought by George Roby as the Benton Review, and he combined it with the Fowler Leader in 1914. The paper's masthead describes it as a combination of the Fowler Leader (founded 1893 by John P. Carr) and the Fowler Republican.

== Circulation ==
Between 1900 and 1905, the Benton Review printed between 1335 and 1540 copies. The Leader claimed over 1000 copies for the same period, and the Republican claimed over 1000 copies for 1903, but these claims could not be verified by Printers' Ink.
