= The Republic (Columbus, Indiana) =

American daily newspaper

- Type: Daily newspaper
- Format: Broadsheet
- Owner: HD Media
- Editor: Noah Crenshaw
- Founded: April 4, 1872, as The Columbus Republican
- Headquarters: 2980 N. National Road, Suite A Columbus, Indiana 47201, United States
- Circulation: 21,500 Daily (as of 2012)
- ISSN: 1086-0649
- Website: therepublic.com

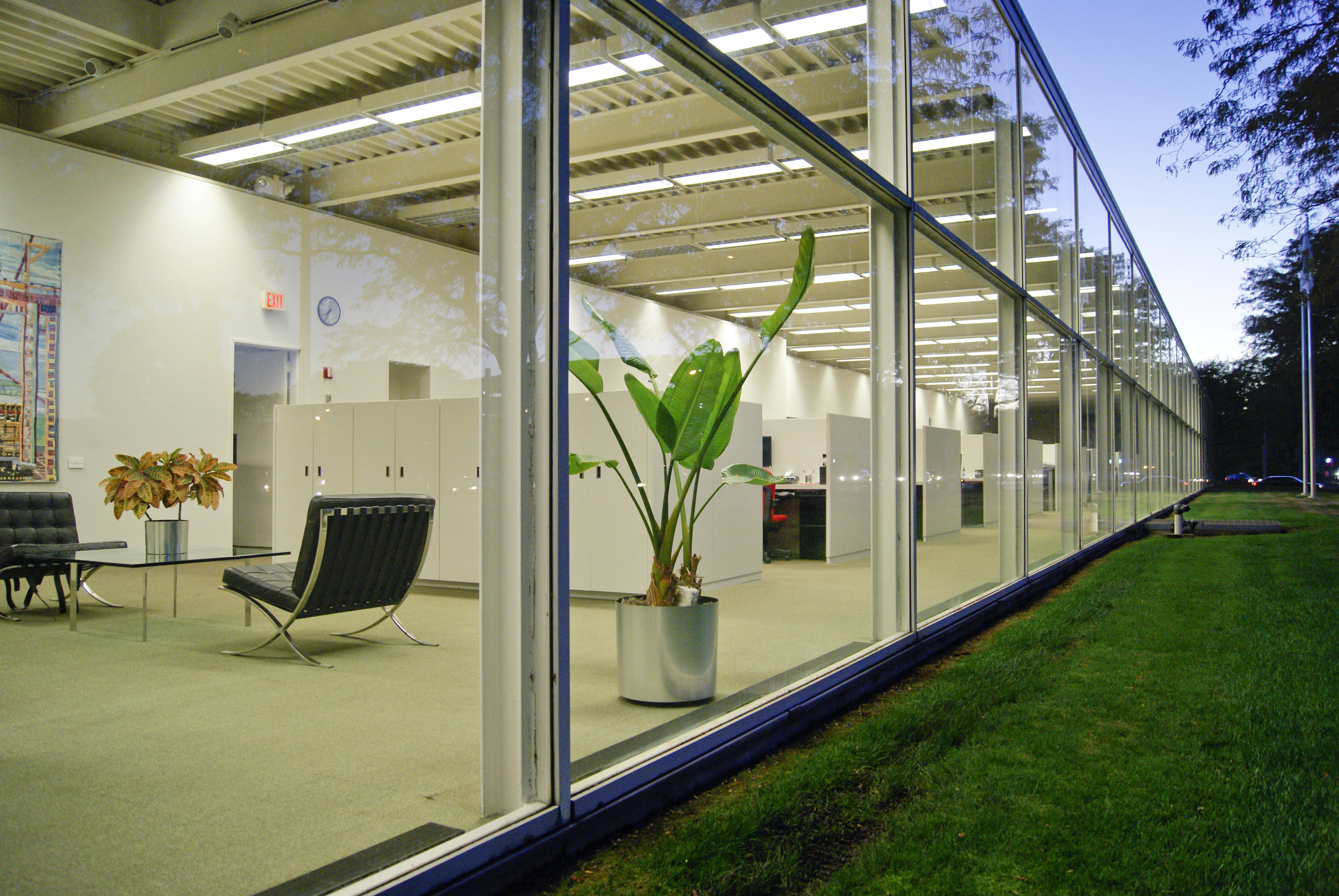
Former Republic newspaper office

The Republic is an American daily newspaper published in Columbus, Indiana, United States. It covers the city of Columbus and several nearby communities in Bartholomew and Jennings counties.

== History ==
Isaac T. Brown founded The Columbus Republican, a weekly newspaper, in 1872. The first issue was published on Thursday, April 4, 1872. Isaac's father, Isaac M. Brown, served as the newspaper's editor during some of the early years. The Browns converted their newspaper to daily publication November 12, 1877, under the name Daily Evening Republican. The newspaper's name was shortened to The Republic in January 1967.

Isaac T. Brown died in 1917, leaving his son Raymond Brown in sole control of the newspaper. It stayed in the Brown family until its owner at the time, Home News Enterprises, a partnership established by Brown family members in 1994, sold to AIM Media Indiana in November 2015.

Over the past 50 years, The Republic has become the flagship newspaper of a chain of dailies and weeklies in Indiana, including several that adjoin The Republic's coverage area. Robert N. Brown, Raymond's son, in 1963 founded the Daily Journal in Johnson County, which borders Bartholomew County to the north. The company expanded its footprint in the Columbus area twice more in the 21st century, purchasing the weekly Brown County Democrat in 2002, and The Tribune daily in Jackson County (immediately south of Bartholomew County) in 2012.

In August 2026, AIM Media Indiana sold the paper to HD Media.

== Newspaper plant and offices ==
The Republic newspaper plant and offices in Columbus were designed by architect Myron Goldsmith (1918–1996) and built in 1971. It is a steel frame and brick Modern style building with a glass and white aluminum curtain wall with some aluminum panels. The rectangular, one-story building measures 248 feet by 93 feet, sits on a low concrete foundation, and has a flat roof.

It was listed on the National Register of Historic Places and as a National Historic Landmark in 2012. The building was featured throughout the 2017 film Columbus.

In 2018, Indiana University purchased the building to house their graduate architecture program.
