= KPC Media Group =

American newspaper publisher

KPC Media Group Inc.
- Company type: Private
- Industry: Commercial printing and newspapers
- Founded: August 7, 1911
- Founder: George W. Baxter; O.E. Michaelis
- Headquarters: 102 North Main Street, Kendallville, Indiana 46755, United States
- Area served: Northeastern Indiana
- Key people: Terry G. Housholder (President/Publisher); Louise D. "Lou" Phelps (CEO); Michael Shain (CFO); Steve Garbacz (Exec. Ed.)
- Products: Three daily newspapers and several weekly publications
- Website: kpcnews.com

KPC Media Group Inc. is an American privately owned printer and publisher of daily and weekly newspapers, based in Kendallville, Indiana.

It was founded in 1911 as Kendallville Publishing Company Inc. by the owners of two competing newspapers in Kendallville, when they merged into The News Sun. Starting in the 1970s, the company extended its reach to other northeastern Indiana locations, and now owns two other daily newspapers and several weeklies and monthlies in the area.

== History ==
The Daily Sun and Daily News in Kendallville merged in 1911 after having competed as daily newspapers for five years, and as weekly newspapers for decades. The Sun traced its history back to the Noble County Journal (founded c. 1860); the Weekly News began in 1877. The two newspapers' publishers, O.E. Michaelis and George W. Baxter, established Kendallville Publishing Company Inc. to run the new Kendallville News-Sun. They established offices on North Main Street in Kendallville, in the same building where KPC Media Group remains headquartered today, more than 100 years later.

Baxter and Michaelis sold the newspaper to Charles O. Merica in 1913; his wife Alice Merica inherited it in 1918 and remained publisher until her death on January 25, 1969, at age 103. She was the oldest newspaper publisher in the United States.

George O. Witwer, publisher from 1969 to 2001, oversaw the company's expansion outside Kendallville, purchasing in December 1971 The Evening Star of Auburn, Indiana, a newspaper that has served DeKalb County since 1871 (since 1913 as a daily). In the 21st century, KPC converted the newspaper to morning publication, seven days a week, and it is now called The Star.

In May 1975, the company bought The Advance Leader of Noble County, Indiana, a weekly newspaper with its roots in the Cromwell Advance (1912) and Ligonier Leader (1880).

Around the turn of the 21st century, the company bought two more properties in adjoining markets, The Garrett Clipper in southern DeKalb County, founded in 1885 and integrated into KPC October 1, 1999, and The Herald Republican of Angola, Indiana in August 2001. The Herald Republican, a semiweekly newspaper at the time KPC bought it, had been formed by Home News Enterprises in 1982 by combining two competing weeklies, the Angola Herald (1876) and Steuben Republican (1857). KPC converted it into a daily newspaper September 12, 2001.

Under current CEO Terry G. Housholder, the company has established a footprint in the city of Fort Wayne, Indiana, both through acquisitions and startups. In early 2005 it established Greater Fort Wayne Business Weekly, a business journal for a 15-county region surrounding Fort Wayne, and Greater Fort Wayne Family, a monthly magazine. In 2006, it purchased Times Community Publications, a chain of free-distribution monthly newspapers covering Fort Wayne and other Allen County communities.

KPC also bought The Butler Bulletin, a weekly in eastern DeKalb County, in 2005.

Also in 2005, the company officially changed its name to KPC Media Group Inc. to reflect its expansion beyond Kendallville. In addition to serving as an abbreviation of its former name, the company has said that KPC stands for "Keeping People Connected".

In 2019, KPC transitioned several of its free monthly publications in Allen County to weekly newspapers, expanding its reach further into the Fort Wayne metro area.

== Holdings ==
The company operates presses in Kendallville, offering commercial printing services in addition to printing KPC's own newspapers. It also has editorial and business offices in Auburn, Angola and Fort Wayne.

KPC's newspapers and magazines, all of which are located in northeastern Indiana, include:

- Aboite News (weekly) of Aboite and Roanoke
- The Advance Leader (weekly) of Cromwell and Ligonier
- Albion New Era (weekly) of Albion
- The Butler Bulletin (weekly) of Butler
- Churubusco News (weekly) of Churubusco
- Dupont Valley Times (weekly) of Huntertown and Leo-Cedarville
- The Garrett Clipper (weekly) of Garrett
- Greater Fort Wayne Business Weekly (weekly) of Fort Wayne
- INFortWayne (online) of Fort Wayne
- INWhitleyCounty (online) of Whitley County
- The Herald Republican (daily) of Angola
- The Leo-Cedarville News (weekly) of Leo-Cedarville
- The News Sun (daily) of Kendallville
- Northwest News (weekly) of Huntertown
- The Star (daily) of Auburn

=== Aboite & About ===
Aboite & About was one of five community publications published by the KPC Media Group, Inc. in Fort Wayne, Indiana. It was a freely circulated, monthly newspaper that was direct mailed to zip codes 46804, 46814 in Fort Wayne and 46783 in Roanoke, Indiana with a circulation of over 20,000 addresses. It contained editorial content pertaining to Southwest Fort Wayne and Allen County and Roanoke, Indiana.

=== Dupont Valley Times ===
The Dupont Valley Times was a freely circulated, monthly newspaper which is direct mailed to zip codes 46818, 46825, 46845 in Fort Wayne, 45748 in Huntertown and 46765 in Leo-Cedarville with a circulation of over 19,000 addresses. It contained editorial content pertaining to Northwest Fort Wayne and Allen County.

=== Georgetown Times ===
The Georgetown Times was a freely circulated, monthly newspaper that was direct mailed to zip codes 46805 and 46815 in East Fort Wayne with a circulation of approximately 15,000 addresses. It contained editorial content pertaining to East Fort Wayne.

=== St. Joe Times ===
The St. Joe Times was a freely circulated, monthly newspaper that was direct mailed to zip code 46835 in Northeast Fort Wayne, with a circulation of approximately 15,000 addresses. It contained editorial content pertaining to Northeast Fort Wayne.

=== East Allen County Times ===
The East Allen County Times was a freely circulated, monthly newspaper which was direct-mailed to zip codes 46774 in New Haven, 46741 in Grabill, 46743 in Harlan, 45745 in Hoagland, 46797 in Woodburn and 46773 in Monroeville with a circulation of over 13,000 addresses. It contained editorial content pertaining to Eastern Allen County, Indiana.

=== Restructuring ===
In 2019, the five KPC Media Group print editions were converted to paid publications under the names of The Aboite News, The Dupont Valley News, The New Haven News, The Leo-Cedarville News, and The Northwest News.
