= Brown County Democrat =

Weekly newspaper published in Nashville, Indiana

- Type: Weekly newspaper
- Format: Broadsheet
- Owner: HD Media
- Publisher: Charles Wells III
- Editor: Courtney Hughett
- Founded: 1883
- Headquarters: 147 E. Main Street; Nashville, Indiana 47448; United States
- Website: bcdemocrat.com

The Brown County Democrat is a weekly newspaper based in Nashville, Indiana, United States of America. It is distributed throughout Jackson, Hamblen, Washington, and Van Buren townships and covers local, state, and national news. It is a five-time recipient of the “Blue Ribbon Newspaper” award given by The Hoosier State Press Association for non-daily newspapers (1972, 1984, 2007, 2010, 2013). The staff at the Democrat were awarded The Hoosier State Press Association's 2018 "Story of the Year" award for their story on #DoSomething.

== History ==
Founded by the George W. Allison family in 1870 under the name The Jacksonian, the Allison family changed its name to the Brown County Democrat in 1883. It was then sold to the families of the Waltmans and the Bonds who maintained ownership until it was purchased by Bruce “Greg” Temple in 1970. In 2002, Home News Enterprises LLC of Columbus purchased the newspaper and held ownership until 2015 when they sold the Democrat to AIM Media Indiana, a sister company of AIM Media Texas. In August 2026, the paper was sold to HD Media.
