= New Paris, Indiana =

- Census-designated place
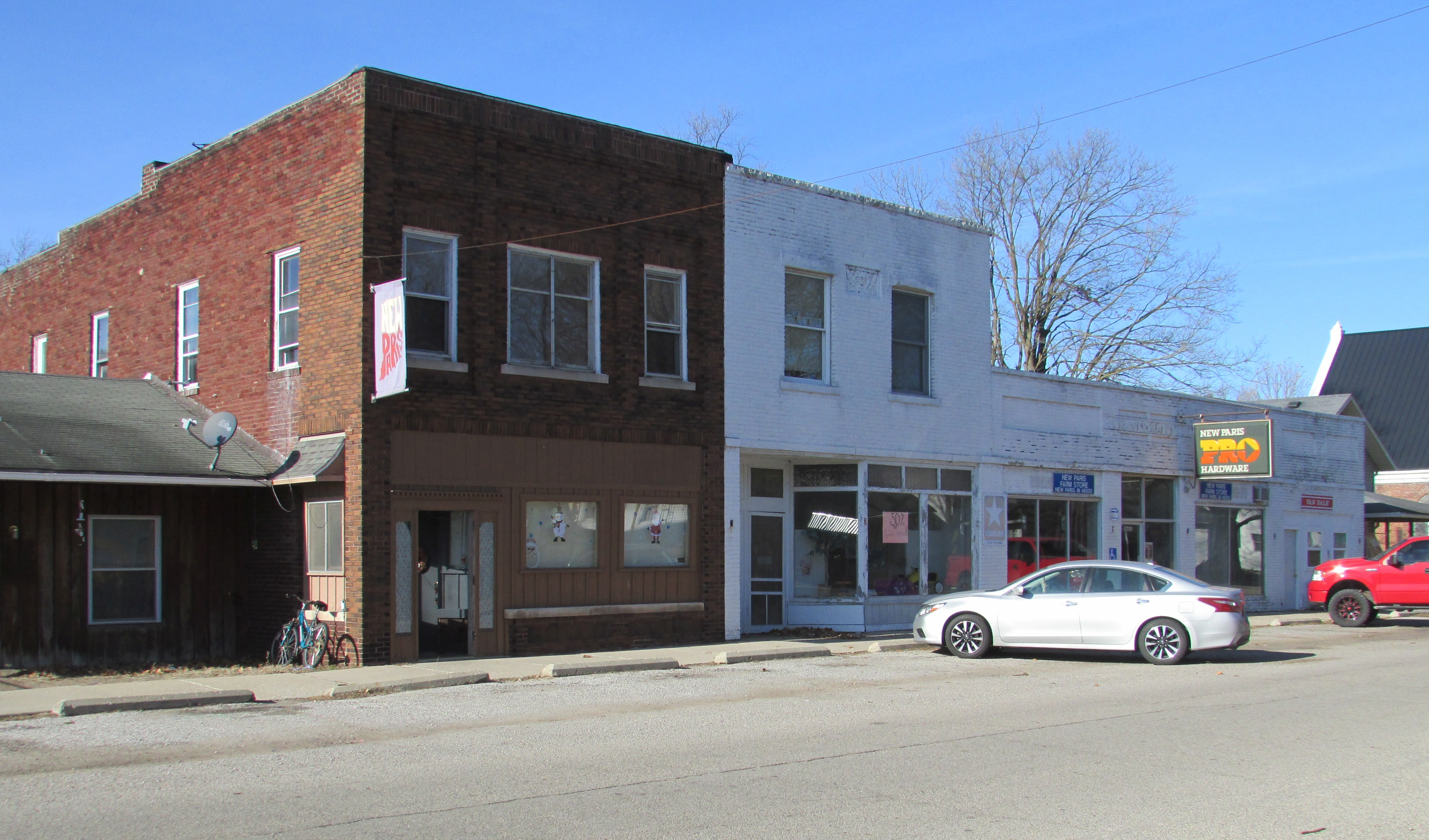
- Main Street, New Paris, Indiana

- Location of New Paris in Elkhart County, Indiana
- Coordinates: 41°29′48″N 85°49′30″W
- Country: United States
- State: Indiana
- County: Elkhart

Area
  - Total: 1.33 sq mi (3.45 km^{2})
  - Land: 1.33 sq mi (3.45 km^{2})
  - Water: 0 sq mi (0.00 km^{2})
- Elevation: 820 ft (250 m)

Population (2020)
  - Total: 1,587
  - Density: 1,190.9/sq mi (459.82/km^{2})
- Time zone: UTC-5 (Eastern (EST))
  - Summer (DST): UTC-4 (EDT)
- ZIP code: 46553
- Area code: 574
- FIPS code: 18-53370
- GNIS feature ID: 2393148

New Paris is a census-designated place (CDP) in Elkhart County, Indiana, United States. As of the 2020 census, New Paris had a population of 1,587.

== History ==
New Paris was laid out in 1839 by settlers from Preble County, Ohio. It was likely named after New Paris, Ohio. By the 1890s, New Paris had become a shipping point at the junction of two railroads.

== Geography ==
New Paris is located in Jackson Township (T35N R6E).

According to the United States Census Bureau, the CDP has a total area of 1.4 square miles (3.5 km^{2}), all land.

== Demographics ==
Historical population
Census	Pop.	Note	%±
2020	1,587		—
U.S. Decennial Census

=== 2020 census ===
As of the 2020 census, New Paris had a population of 1,587. The median age was 33.9 years. 28.2% of residents were under the age of 18 and 13.2% of residents were 65 years of age or older. For every 100 females there were 102.2 males, and for every 100 females age 18 and over there were 96.6 males age 18 and over.

100.0% of residents lived in urban areas, while 0.0% lived in rural areas.

There were 570 households in New Paris, of which 35.6% had children under the age of 18 living in them. Of all households, 58.9% were married-couple households, 16.5% were households with a male householder and no spouse or partner present, and 19.6% were households with a female householder and no spouse or partner present. About 21.4% of all households were made up of individuals and 9.1% had someone living alone who was 65 years of age or older.

There were 609 housing units, of which 6.4% were vacant. The homeowner vacancy rate was 3.5% and the rental vacancy rate was 0.0%.

Racial composition as of the 2020 census
Race	Number	Percent
White	1,443	90.9%
Black or African American	9	0.6%
American Indian and Alaska Native	9	0.6%
Asian	0	0.0%
Native Hawaiian and Other Pacific Islander	0	0.0%
Some other race	38	2.4%
Two or more races	88	5.5%
Hispanic or Latino (of any race)	147	9.3%

=== 2000 census ===
As of the 2000 census, there were 1,006 people, 377 households, and 286 families residing in the CDP. The population density was 1,209.3 inhabitants per square mile (466.9/km^{2}). There were 390 housing units at an average density of 468.8 per square mile (181.0/km^{2}). The racial makeup of the CDP was 97.71% White, 0.10% Native American, 1.19% from other races, and 0.99% from two or more races. Hispanic or Latino of any race were 1.99% of the population.

There were 377 households, out of which 34.7% had children over the age of 18 living with them, 63.1% were married couples living together, 8.2% had a female householder with no husband present, and 23.9% were non-families. 20.7% of all households were made up of individuals, and 6.9% had someone living alone who was 65 years of age or older. The average household size was 2.67 and the average family size was 3.09.

In the CDP, the population was spread out, with 29.7% under the age of 18, 7.0% from 18 to 24, 28.4% from 25 to 44, 20.3% from 45 to 64, and 14.6% who were 65 years of age or older. The median age was 35 years. For every 100 females, there were 95.3 males. For every 100 females age 18 and over, there were 93.2 males.

The median income for a household in the CDP was $42,446, and the median income for a family was $47,917. Males had a median income of $36,250 versus $24,038 for females. The per capita income for the CDP was $17,270. About 4.3% of families and 5.0% of the population were below the poverty line, including 7.9% of those under age 18 and none of those age 65 or over.

== Schools ==
New Paris Elementary School was built in 1920 and served originally as a K-12 school. Fairfield Junior-Senior High School was created in 1968, and subsequently served as the secondary school fed by New Paris and Millersburg Elementary School. In 1999, a new elementary school named Benton Elementary School opened to serve the rural areas of New Paris and Millersburg. The enrollment at New Paris Elementary dropped as a result of Benton, but over time enrollment returned to historic levels. In 2004, construction began on a new elementary school that was in a more rural area of New Paris.

== Sunnyside Park ==
The park is a lightly stocked fishing and recreational pond with a nearby park building and several veterans' memorials. There is also a playground and outdoor pavilion.

In 2007, the park building was renovated and a parking area was paved.

== Media ==
The Farmer's Exchange is a weekly newspaper based in New Paris. It was founded in 1926 and covers northern Indiana and Southern Michigan.
