= Broad Ripple Village, Indianapolis =

District of Indianapolis in Indiana, US

Broad Ripple Village
- Indianapolis Cultural District
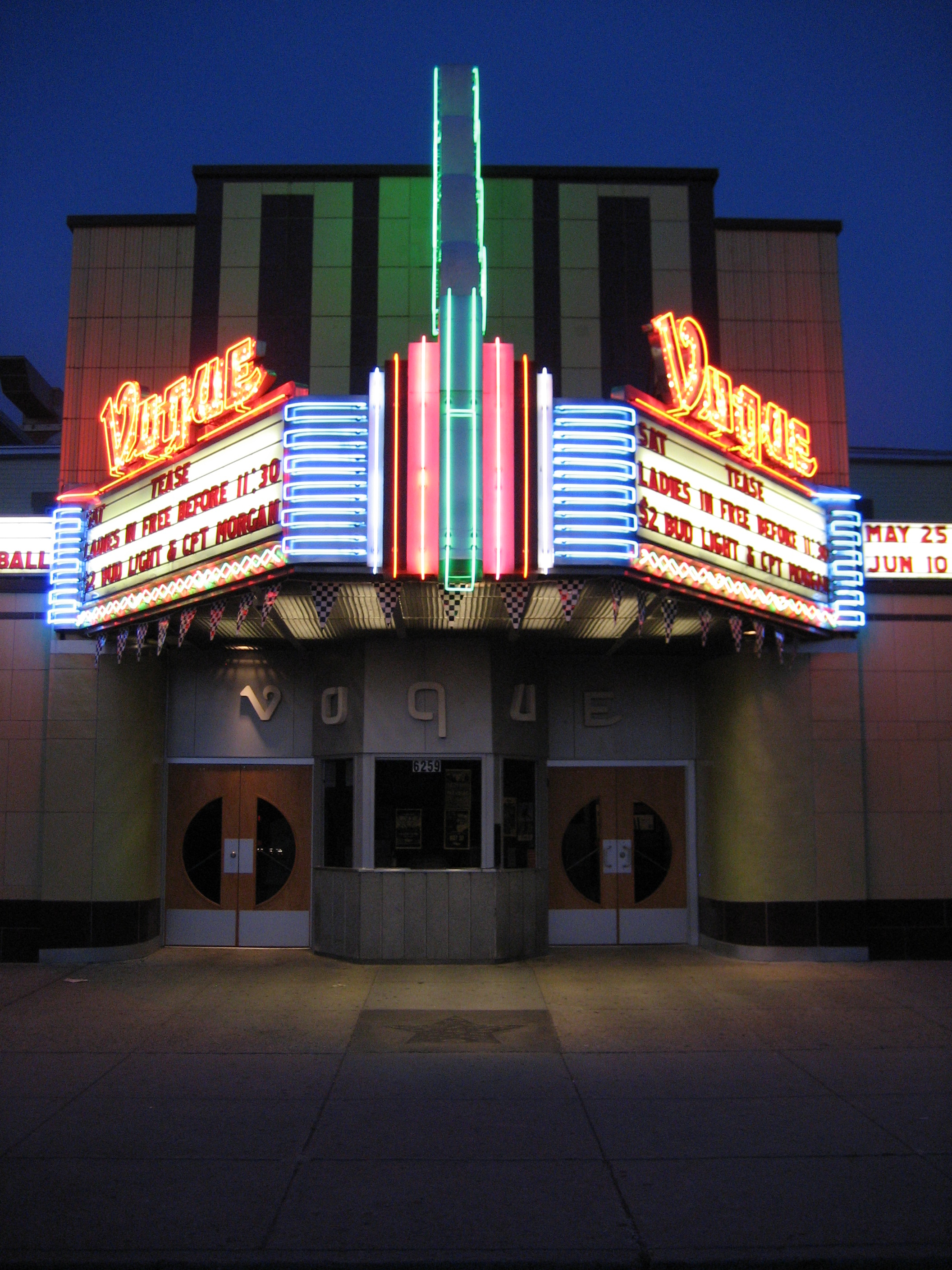
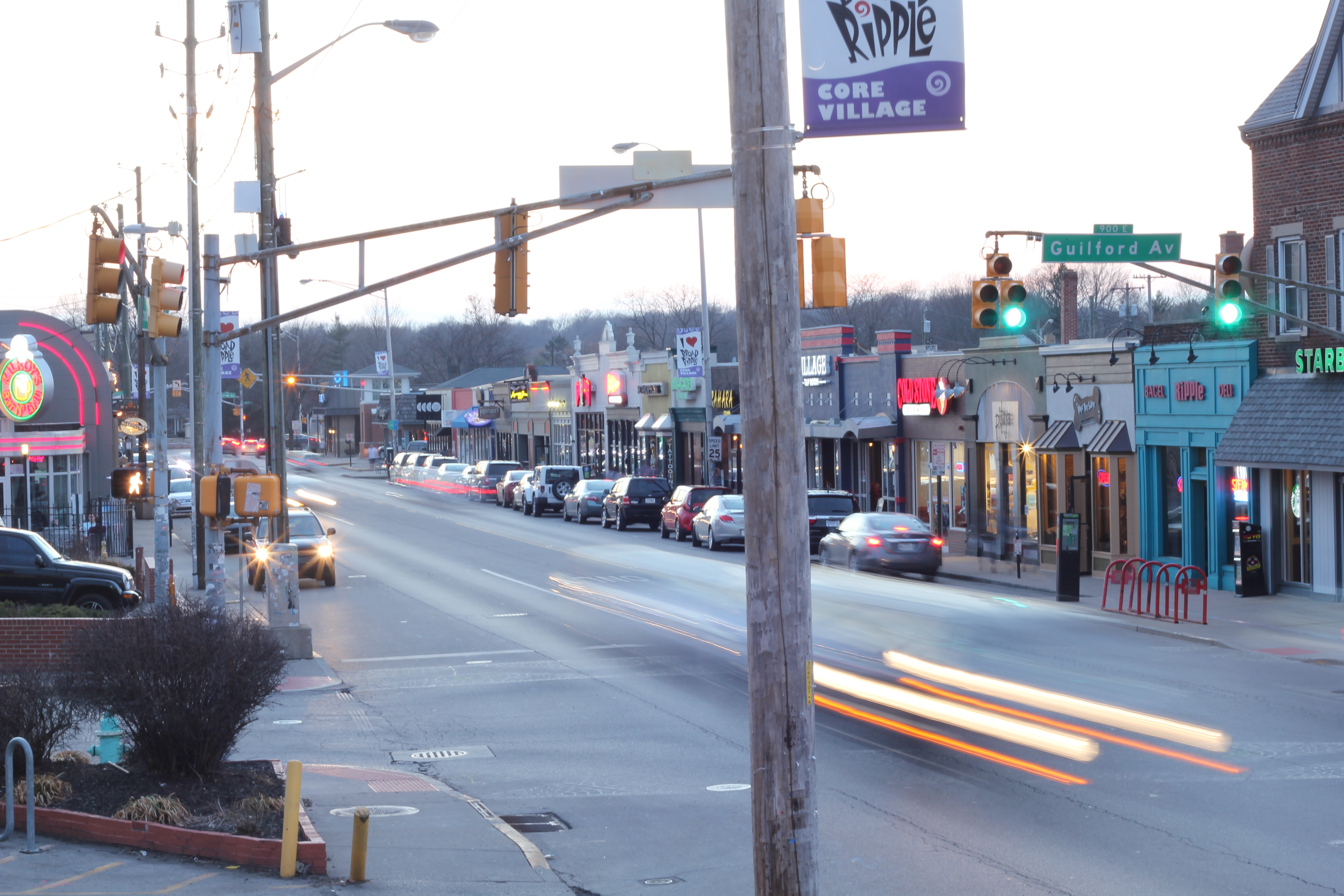
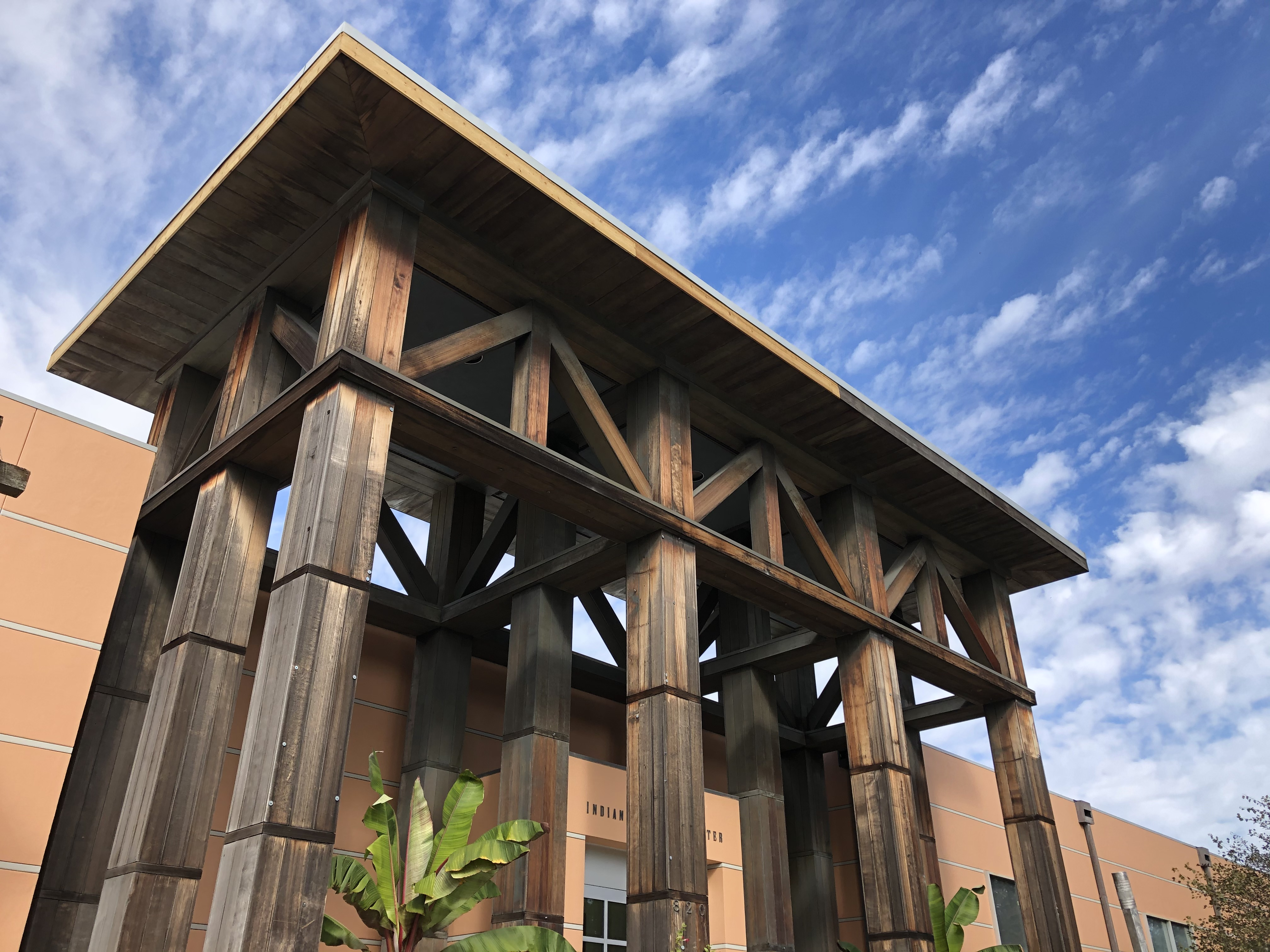
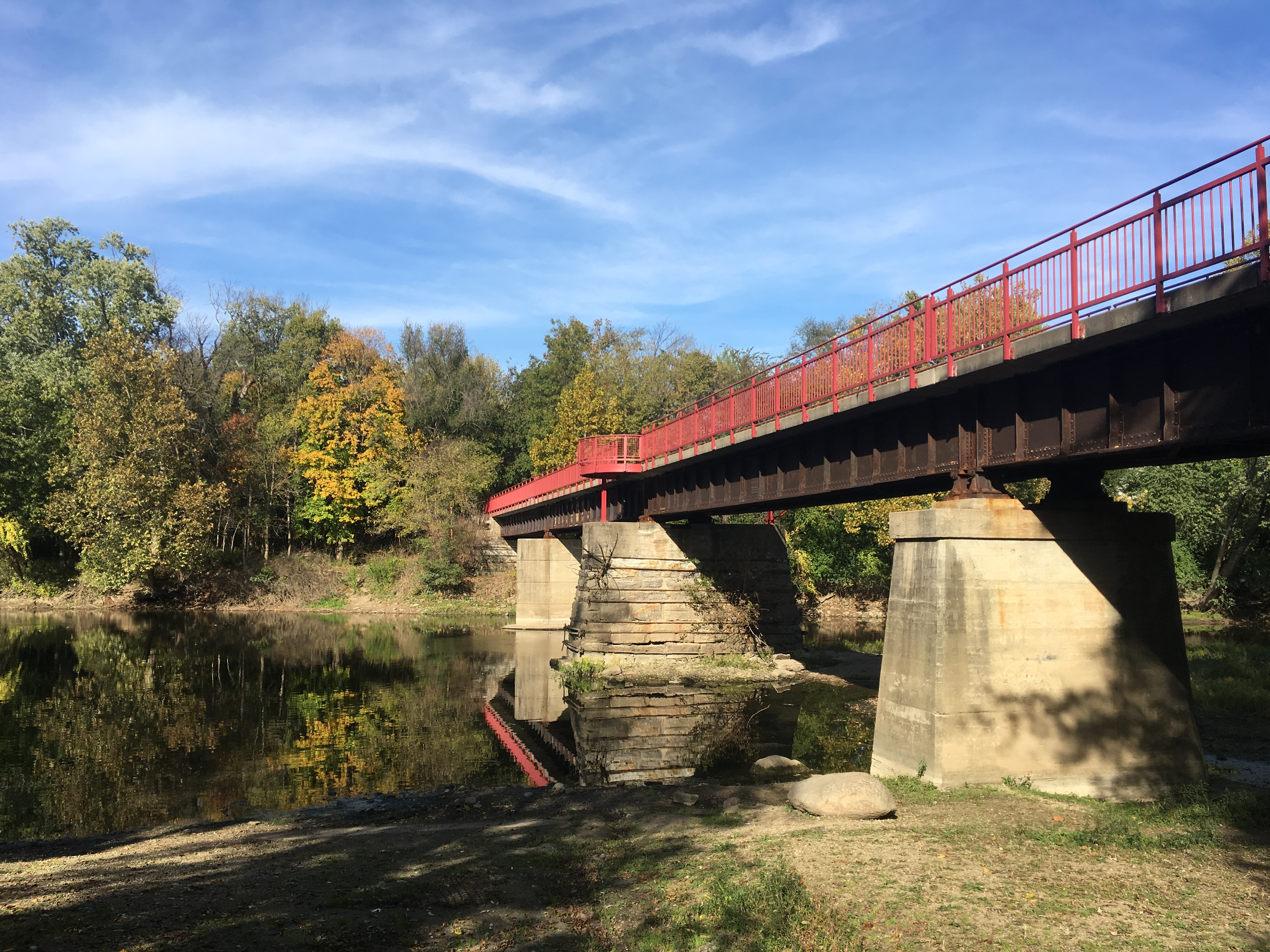
- Clockwise from top left: The Vogue, Broad Ripple Avenue streetscape, Monon Trail over the White River, and Indianapolis Art Center

- Seal
- Interactive map of Broad Ripple Village
- Coordinates: 39°52′00″N 86°8′30″W
- Country: United States
- State: Indiana
- County: Marion
- Township: Washington
- City: Indianapolis

Area
  - Total: 10.455 sq mi (27.08 km^{2})
- Elevation: 725 ft (221 m)

Population (2020)
  - Total: 7,461
- Time zone: UTC-5 (Eastern (EST))
  - Summer (DST): UTC-4 (EDT)
- Zip code: 46220
- GNIS feature ID: 0449481
- Website: www.broadrippleindy.org

Broad Ripple Village is a neighborhood and designated cultural district in Indianapolis, Indiana, United States. Located in Washington Township, about six miles (ten kilometers) north of downtown Indianapolis, Broad Ripple was first platted in 1837, became incorporated as the Town of Broad Ripple in 1894, and was annexed to the City of Indianapolis in 1922.

Broad Ripple's proximity to Butler University has cultivated a longstanding local arts and social scene with a reputation for being socially, economically, and ethnically diverse. Notable points of interest include the Indiana Central Canal, the Indianapolis Art Center, the Monon Trail, and public access to the White River.

== History ==
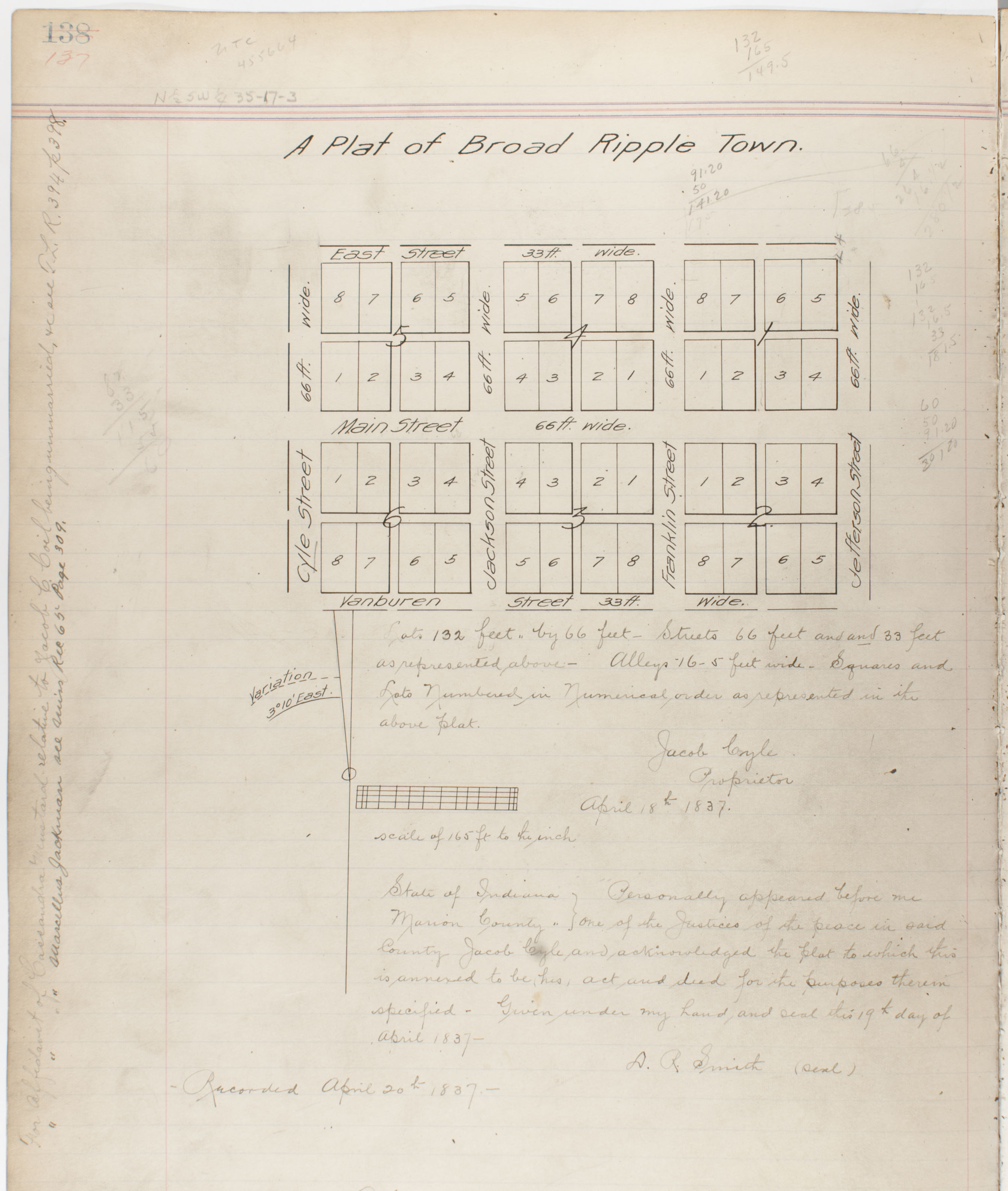
The plat of Broad Ripple from 1837

The public school system dates back to at least 1843, when Washington Township School Number Five was built. Washington Township School Number Fourteen was built in 1854. A newer, four-room brick school, "built to accommodate the advanced pupils of the entire township", opened in 1884. Broad Ripple High School originated as a two-year program in 1886, becoming a three-year program in 1887 and a four-year program sometime between 1893 and 1895. The grade school and high school shared buildings, including the newer 1914 building, until 1926. Broad Ripple High School became the fourth high school in Indianapolis Public Schools in autumn 1923 after Broad Ripple was annexed to Indianapolis. The high school closed at the end of the 2017–2018 school year. The high school reopened as Broad Ripple Middle School in 2024.

Broad Ripple was annexed to the city of Indianapolis in June 1922, after previous failed attempts in 1906, 1909, and 1913, and several other times.

== Culture ==
Broad Ripple Park is a 62-acre (25 ha) park bordering the White River and located just to the northeast of the village. It features an outdoor swimming pool, tennis courts, baseball diamond, athletic fields, playground, picnic shelters, dog park, wooded preserve, fitness path, and a boat ramp.

In 1987, Lillian R. Barcio founded and served as the editor in chief of Broad Ripple's first dedicated monthly newspaper, The Village Sampler. The first issue was published in June 1987. The paper ceased publication in December 1998. In 2004 a free biweekly newspaper, The Broad Ripple Gazette, was created by Broad Ripple native Alan Hague.

== Transportation ==
Broad Ripple is connected to downtown Indianapolis on public bus rapid transit via IndyGo's Red Line (Route 90). The Red Line's Broad Ripple Station is located in the median of College Avenue and is accessed from College's intersection with Broad Ripple Avenue and Westfield Boulevard. Other IndyGo traditional bus routes also run through the village, connecting it to additional neighborhoods in Indianapolis.

Indiana Pacers Bikeshare launched in the neighborhood on September 5, 2019, with two of the system's 50 docking stations located in Broad Ripple.

== Notable people ==
David Letterman, standup comedian and late-night talk show host, grew up in Broad Ripple. The home is now an Airbnb.

== See also ==
- Indianapolis Cultural Districts
- List of neighborhoods in Indianapolis
