= Farmer's Exchange =

Weekly newspaper in Indiana and Michigan, United States

The Farmers Exchange
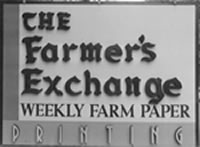
- Type: Weekly newspaper
- Owner(s): Matt Yeater
- Founder(s): Waldo E. Yeater
- Publisher: Farmers Exchange Company
- Editor-in-chief: Matt Yeater
- Editor: Jerry Goshert
- Founded: 5 November 1926
- Political alignment: Prohibition Party
- Language: English
- Headquarters: 19401 Industrial Dr, New Paris, IN 46553
- City: New Paris
- Country: USA
- Circulation: 11,000
- Website: farmers-exchange.net

The Farmer's Exchange is a weekly newspaper based in New Paris, Indiana, United States of America. Serving Northern Indiana and Southern Michigan, the Farmers Exchange is an agriculture newspaper that publishes auctions of all varieties. The Farmers Exchange began in 1926 and still serves the area today. In the book, The Twenty-Seventh Child: A Witness of History, by Harper Garris, the Farmers Exchange is mentioned as the place of work for the main character.

== History ==
The Farmer's Exchange was launched by four men who published the first issue on 5 November 1926. Waldo E. Yeater one of the original four men was the only one to stay on after the first year. He was extremely involved in the paper and was a proud member of the Prohibition Party. Yeater didn't waste any time hiring his loved ones to work with him at the newspaper. His son Lawrence Yeater began working at the newspaper at the age of seven years old. In 1974 Lawrence's son Steve became the owner of the paper as the families third generation owner. In 2003 Steve's son Matthew took over the newspaper as the fourth generation Yeater owner with Jerry Goshert as the editor.

== Current status ==
The Farmer's Exchange currently holds around 11,000 subscriptions and is published weekly on Fridays. The family also owns the publishing company used by the Farmer's Exchange, the Exchange Publishing Corporation. The Exchange Publishing Corporation has published different books written by the Yeater family. For example, The Yeater Book written by Waldo E. Yeater was published by his own publishing corporation, Exchange Publishing.

== Significant achievements ==
Matt Yeater was an honored guest at the annual Purdue Extension Board reorganization meeting on March 20, 2014.

The Farmer's Exchange was noticed by the Purdue Extension's Director for supporting the Purdue Extension and for keeping agriculture a part of today's youth.

In a bibliography, The History of Tofu and Tofu Products, compiled by William Shurtleff and Akiko Aoyagi, the Farmer's Exchange is mentioned multiple times for the discussion of research on soybeans for tofu.
