= The News Sun =

American daily newspaper based in Indiana

- Type: Daily newspaper
- Format: Broadsheet
- Owner(s): KPC Media Group
- Publisher: Terry G. Housholder
- Editor: Steve Garbacz
- Founded: August 7, 1911, as Kendallville News-Sun
- Headquarters: 102 North Main Street, Kendallville, Indiana 46755, United States
- Circulation: 8,421 daily; 7,636 Sundays in 2012
- Sister newspapers: The Herald Republican; The Star
- ISSN: 8750-0876
- Website: kpcnews.com

The News Sun is an American daily newspaper published in Kendallville, Indiana. It is the flagship newspaper of KPC Media Group.

It covers the city of Kendallville and several nearby communities in LaGrange and Noble counties.

== History ==
Though it numbers its issues from August 1911 and celebrated 2011 as its 100th anniversary, The News Sun—known as the Kendallville News-Sun before July 1984—can trace its history back to the mid-19th century, through the Daily News and Daily Sun newspapers that merged in 1911 and the succession of weekly newspapers that preceded them.

The Daily Sun's oldest predecessor was the weekly Noble County Journal, founded c. 1860; it later became the Kendallville Standard. The Weekly News began in 1877. By 1906 both had converted to dailies; in 1911 the two newspapers' publishers, O.E. Michaelis and George W. Baxter, established Kendallville Publishing Company Inc. and merged their papers. They established offices on North Main Street in Kendallville, in the same building where The News Sun and KPC Media Group remain headquartered today, more than 100 years later.

Baxter and Michaelis sold the newspaper to Charles O. Merica in 1913; his wife Alice Merica inherited it in 1918 and remained publisher until her death on January 25, 1969, at age 103. She was the oldest newspaper publisher in the United States.

Originally an afternoon newspaper printed six days per week, in 2000 The News Sun added a Sunday edition and on April 6, 2009, it converted to morning publication.

== Sister papers ==
The News Sun is one of three daily newspapers published by KPC Media Group; the other two, both of which cover adjoining counties, are The Herald Republican and The Star.

The company also owns multiple weekly publications in Noble County, DeKalb County, Allen County and Whitley County.

Among those weekly publications is The Advance Leader, which overlaps with The News Sun's coverage in western Noble County. The Advance Leader was formed May 14, 1975, after KPC purchased and merged the Cromwell Advance of Cromwell (founded 1912) and the Ligonier Leader of Ligonier (1880).
