= The Herald Republican =

Newspaper

- Type: Daily newspaper
- Format: Broadsheet
- Owner(s): KPC Media Group
- Publisher: Terry G. Housholder
- Editor: Michael Marturello
- Founded: May 1857; 168 years ago, as The Steuben Republican
- Headquarters: 45 South Public Square, Angola, Indiana 46703, United States
- Circulation: 4,600 daily; 4,666 Sundays in 2012
- Sister newspapers: The News Sun; The Star
- OCLC number: 12149728
- Website: KPCnews.com

The Herald Republican is an American daily newspaper published in Angola, Indiana. It is owned by KPC Media Group.

It covers the city of Angola and all of Steuben County in the northeastern corner of Indiana.

== History ==
Two competing weekly newspapers, the Steuben Republican (founded in 1857 by J. M. Bromagen as a Republican paper) and the Angola Herald (founded in 1876 by Isaac L. Wiseman, Democratic in politics), formed the Steuben Printing Company as a joint venture in 1925 and eventually became sister newspapers upon the death of the Herald's publisher, Harvey Morley, in the 1960s.

The Willis family, which had published the Republican since 1906, maintained both papers' independence until 1980, when they were merged into The Steuben County Herald-Republican. The merged paper was acquired in 1982 by Home News Enterprises, based in Columbus, Indiana, which increased its frequency to two issues per week in 1989. Citing a desire to concentrate on its Central Indiana properties, Home News sold the Herald-Republican to Kendallville Publishing Company, which already owned The News Sun and The Evening Star dailies in neighboring counties. The new owners converted it into a daily newspaper September 12, 2001.

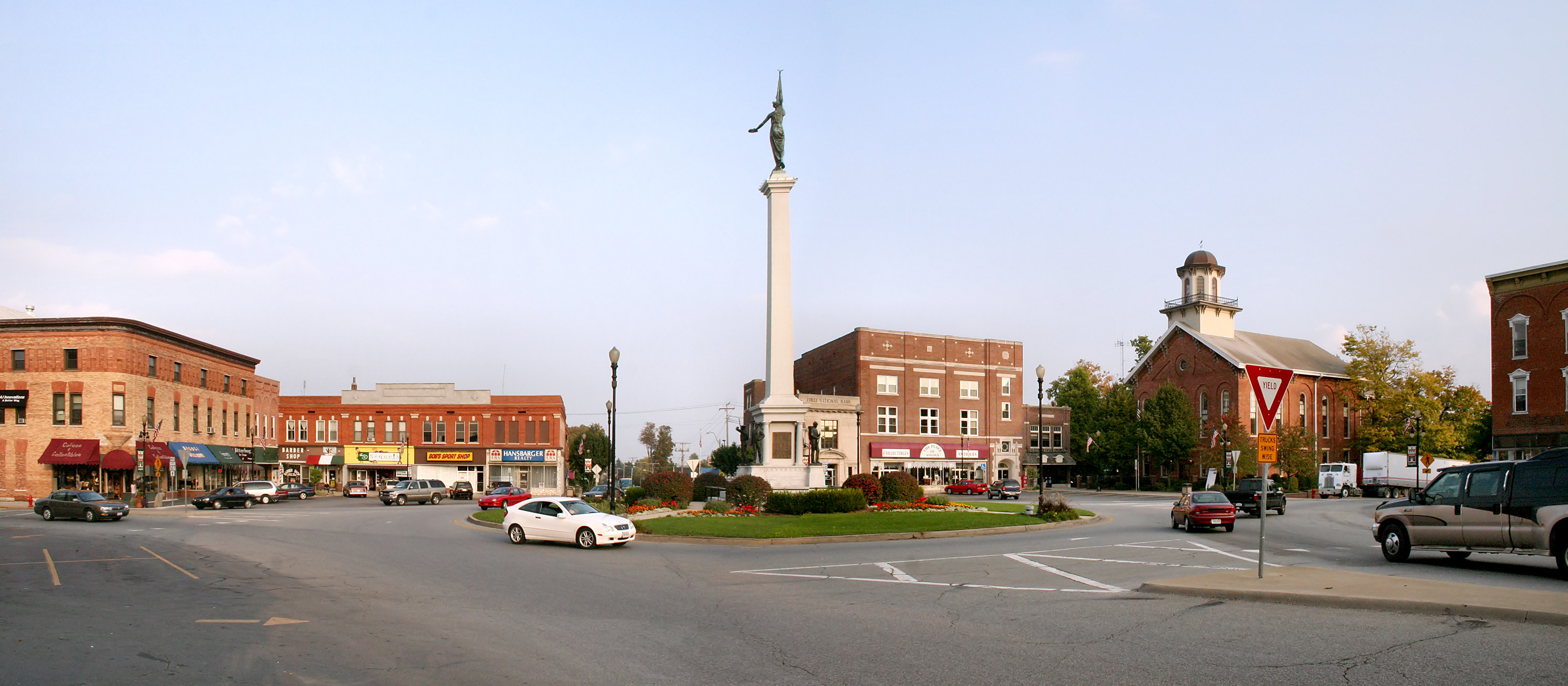
Public Square in Angola. The Herald Republican offices can be seen in the third building to the right of the monument.

== Sister papers ==
The Herald Republican is one of three daily newspapers published by KPC Media Group; the other two, both of which cover adjoining Indiana counties, are The News Sun in Kendallville and The Star in Auburn.

The company also owns several monthly publications in Fort Wayne, Indiana, and three weekly newspapers in nearby DeKalb and Noble counties.
