= AIM Media Management =

U.S. community-newspaper owner based in Dallas, founded in 2012

- Type: Private
- Industry: Newspapers; local media; commercial printing; marketing services
- Founded: 2012
- Founder: Jeremy L. Halbreich
- Headquarters: Dallas, Texas, United States
- Areas served: Indiana; Ohio; Texas; West Virginia

AIM Media Management is a privately held American newspaper company headquartered in Dallas, Texas. Through its subsidiaries AIM Media Indiana, AIM Media Midwest (also known as Digital AIM Media), and AIM Media Texas, it publishes dozens of daily and weekly newspapers in Indiana, Ohio, and Texas, respectively. The company was founded in 2012 by newspaper executive Jeremy L. Halbreich and grew through acquisitions including Texas properties divested by Freedom Communications in 2012, Home News Enterprises in 2015, and a large Civitas Media cluster in Ohio and West Virginia in 2017.

== History ==
=== Formation and Texas acquisitions (2012) ===
AIM Media was created to acquire Freedom Communications’ Texas newspapers, including The Monitor (McAllen), Valley Morning Star (Harlingen), The Brownsville Herald, El Nuevo Heraldo and the Odessa American. The transaction established AIM Media Texas as the company’s first operating unit.

=== Expansion to Indiana (2015–2016) ===
In November 2015, AIM Media Indiana acquired the publishing and commercial printing assets of Home News Enterprises, a family-owned group whose titles included The Republic (Columbus), the Daily Journal (Franklin), the Daily Reporter (Greenfield) and the Seymour Tribune.

=== AIM Media Midwest and Civitas Media cluster (2017–2019) ===
In June 2017, AIM created AIM Media Midwest to acquire Civitas Media’s Ohio/West Virginia properties - widely reported as 16 daily papers in Ohio, one in West Virginia, and associated weeklies and shoppers, such as The Lima News, The Delaware Gazette, Portsmouth Daily Times, Sidney Daily News, and Wilmington News Journal. AIM Media Midwest subsequently acquired Bryan Times and Northwest Signal in 2022–23.

=== Restructuring (2023–2025) ===
Beginning in 2023, AIM reduced print frequency at multiple titles while emphasizing digital publishing across its portfolio.

In 2025, AIM Media Texas agreed to sell The Monitor’s McAllen headquarters to the University of Texas Rio Grande Valley.

== Operations ==
AIM Media Management oversees three regional subsidiaries:

- AIM Media Texas (Rio Grande Valley and West Texas), including The Monitor, Valley Morning Star, The Brownsville Herald, El Nuevo Heraldo and the Odessa American.
- AIM Media Indiana (central and southern Indiana), including The Republic, Daily Journal, Daily Reporter and Seymour Tribune.
- AIM Media Midwest (western and central Ohio, one daily in West Virginia), including The Lima News, Delaware Gazette, Portsmouth Daily Times, Wilmington News Journal, Sidney Daily News and others.

== Leadership ==
AIM Media was founded by Jeremy L. Halbreich, former president and general manager of The Dallas Morning News, former CEO of American Consolidated Media, and former chairman/CEO of Sun-Times Media. He serves as chairman and chief executive officer. William R. Starks serves as president and chief operating officer.
