= The Star (Auburn) =

- Type: Daily newspaper
- Format: Broadsheet
- Owner: KPC Media Group
- Publisher: Terry G. Housholder
- Editor: David R. Kurtz
- Founded: January 1, 1871, as The Auburn Courier
- Headquarters: 118 West Ninth Street, Auburn, Indiana 46706, United States
- Circulation: 4,352 Daily; 6,127 Sundays; (as of 2012)
- Sister newspapers: The Herald Republican; The News Sun
- OCLC number: 15698269
- Website: kpcnews.com

The Star is an American daily newspaper published in Auburn, Indiana. It is owned by KPC Media Group.

It covers the city of Auburn and all of DeKalb County in northeastern Indiana.

== History ==
The weekly Courier, founded in Auburn in 1871, established a daily edition, The Daily Courier, in 1894. This newspaper merged with the Auburn Dispatch (formed 1874) to become The Evening Star in 1913.

The merged paper remained locally owned until 1968, when it was purchased by Nixon Newspapers of Wabash, Indiana. Kendallville Publishing Company, owners of the Kendallville News-Sun in adjoining Noble County, bought The Evening Star in December 1971. KPC added a Sunday edition on March 12, 2000, and converted the daily paper to morning publication seven days a week on April 6, 2009, shortening its name to The Star.

== Sister papers ==
The Star is one of three daily newspapers published by KPC Media Group; the other two, both of which cover adjoining counties, are The Herald Republican and The News Sun.

The company also owns several monthly publications in Fort Wayne, Indiana, and three weekly newspapers, two of which complement The Star in DeKalb County:

- The Butler Bulletin, serving Butler and eastern DeKalb County, founded by Joe Shelton in 1976 and purchased from him by KPC in December 2005.
- The Garrett Clipper, serving Garrett and southern DeKalb County, founded in 1885 by A.J. Little and H. E. Little and sold to KPC by Wayne and Pat Bartles on Oct. 1, 1999.
