= Greensburg Daily News =

American newspaper in Indiana, founded 1894

- Type: Daily newspaper
- Format: Broadsheet
- Owner(s): CNHI, LLC
- Founded: 1894 (131 years ago)
- Political alignment: Non-partisan
- Language: English
- Headquarters: 135 South Franklin Street, Greensburg, Indiana 47240 United States
- Circulation: 5,444 (as of February 2006)
- Sister newspapers: Indiana: see list
- Website: www.greensburgdailynews.com

The Greensburg Daily News is a daily newspaper in Greensburg, Indiana. It is owned by CNHI.

== History ==
The first issue of the Greensburg Daily News was published January 1, 1894 by Worrell Newspapers of Indiana. The independent Republican paper was printed every day except Sunday. Weekly editions of the paper included the Weekly News (1899–1901), Greensburg News (1901–1917) and Greensburg Standard (1918–1925). In 1918, the Greensburg Daily News absorbed the Greensburg Daily Review, a Republican paper created by Braden & Remy.

In May 2020, the CNHI publication Rushville Republican was discontinued and merged with Greensburg Daily News; this was one of the 16 publications shut down by owner CNHI due to business losses associated with the economic impact of the COVID-19 pandemic in the United States.
