= Crawfordsville monster =

Creature allegedly sighted in Indiana, US in 1891

The Crawfordsville monster refers to an alleged creature reported by residents of Crawfordsville, Indiana, in 1891. It was subsequently suggested the incident was actually as a flock of killdeer which had been confused by newly installed electric lights.

The story was described by Jerome Clark as "among the most fantastic of all UFO reports", and contributed to early theories of UFOs as airborne organisms.

== History ==
On September 5, 1891, the Crawfordsville Journal reported that two ice delivery men sighted "a strange phenomenon" that hovered in the air above their location, describing it as a "horrible apparition" that "filled them with dread". A similar sighting was reported by a Methodist pastor and his wife. The Crawfordsville Journal described it as "about eighteen feet [5.5 m] long and eight feet [2.5 m] wide and moved rapidly through the air by means of several pairs of side fins. It was pure white and had no definite shape or form, resembling somewhat a great white shroud fitted with propelling fins. There was no tail or head visible but there was one great flaming eye, and a sort of a wheezing plaintive sound was emitted from a mouth which was invisible. It flapped like a flag in the winds as it came on and frequently gave a great squirm as though suffering unutterable agony." According to interviews conducted years later by Crawfordsville reporter and Fortean Society member Vincent Gaddis, hundreds of residents observed the phenomenon on the following evening, with some claiming they could feel the monster's "hot breath" as it swooped over them.

The Indianapolis Journal repeated the September 5th sightings, as did other newspapers across the country, including the Brooklyn Eagle, whose article later attracted the attention of early paranormal investigator Charles Fort. The Crawfordsville Postmaster was deluged with mail, and reports of the sightings generated both ridicule and a number of believers. Two local men, John Hornbeck and Abe Hernley, "followed the wraith about town and finally discovered it to be a flock of many hundred killdeer". The Crawfordsville Journal suggested that Crawfordsville's newly installed electric lights disoriented the birds, which caused them to hover above the city. The birds' wings and white under-feathers likely resulted in misidentification.

== In popular culture ==
The monster has been adapted as a fantasy games monster under the D20-Modern gaming system, where it is classified as being an ooze-based creature that resembles an amoeba. The myth was featured on an episode of the History Channel show MonsterQuest. The incident is also depicted in a story about alleged "living UFOs" in Issue #3 of the Gold Key Comics series UFO Flying Saucers (1972).
