= The Tribune (Seymour, Indiana) =

Newspaper in Seymour, Indiana, US

- Type: Biweekly newspaper
- Format: Broadsheet
- Owner: HD Media
- Publisher: Bud Hunt
- Editor: Aubrey Woods
- Founded: 1885, as Seymour Daily Republican
- Headquarters: 100 St. Louis Avenue, Seymour, Indiana 47274, United States
- Circulation: 2,400 on Wednesday & Saturday (as of 2023)
- OCLC number: 32432730
- Website: tribtown.com

The Tribune is an American twice weekly newspaper, published Wednesday and Saturday, in Seymour, Indiana. The publication covers the city of Seymour and all of Jackson County, Indiana.

== History ==
Founded as the Seymour Daily Republican in 1885, the newspaper adopted the name Seymour Daily Tribune in 1920, shortening it to The Tribune on September 10, 1994. Freedom Communications purchased the paper in 1973, and sold it in 2012 to Home News Enterprises of Columbus, Indiana. At that time its circulation was 6,800.

In August 2026, AIM Media Indiana sold the paper to HD Media.
