= Daily Journal (Franklin, Indiana) =

Daily newspaper in Franklin, Indiana

- Type: Daily newspaper
- Format: Broadsheet
- Owner: HD Media
- Publisher: Richard Clark
- Editor: Leeann Doerflein
- Founded: July 23, 1963
- Language: English
- Headquarters: 30 S. Water Street, Suite A, Franklin, Indiana 46131, United States
- Circulation: 16,900 daily 17,700 Saturdays
- OCLC number: 11793729
- Website: dailyjournal.net

The Daily Journal is an American daily newspaper published Monday through Saturday mornings in Franklin, Indiana. It is owned by AIM Media Indiana.

It covers the entirety of Johnson County, Indiana, including Bargersville, Edinburgh, Franklin, Greenwood, New Whiteland, Trafalgar, Whiteland and White River Township.

In addition to the daily newspaper, the Daily Journal also produces the Edinburgh Courier, a weekly newspaper published on Wednesdays in Edinburgh, Indiana. The newspaper formerly produced The Crier, which served Camp Atterbury, but this is no longer produced.

The Daily Journal has won several Indiana journalism awards, including the Blue Ribbon Daily award from the Hoosier State Press Association, most recently in 2022.

== History ==
Robert N. Brown started the Daily Journal in July 1963 as a sister paper to The Republic in Columbus, Indiana, which his grandfather had started in 1872 and which covered Bartholomew County, which adjoins Johnson County to the south.

The newspaper stayed in the family until being purchased by AIM Media in late 2015. Daily newspapers in Johnson County date back to the 1880s, and when the Daily Journal debuted it joined a newspaper war with The Franklin Evening Star, which had a history dating back to 1881. After six years, the war ended, with the Daily Journal absorbing its afternoon competitor in December 1969. The newspaper also purchased The Franklin Evening Star's sister publication, the Edinburgh Daily Courier, as part of the deal.

In February 2012, Home News Enterprises, the publisher of the paper, announced that with newspaper printing consolidated at the company's presses in Columbus, the Daily Journal planned to sell its plant on U.S. 31 to KYB Americas, an auto-parts manufacturer, and relocate its newsroom and business offices to the historic Hazelett building in downtown Franklin. Indiana-based Bemis Group, a commercial construction firm, managed the project to renovate the Hazelett building. Today, the space includes a bicycle company, bakery and wellness company.

In November 2015, Home News Enterprises announced that it was selling the Daily Journal and its sister newspapers, online and commercial properties to AIM Media Indiana, an affiliate of AIM Media Texas. In August 2026, the paper was sold to HD Media.

== Special Publications ==
Along with the Edinburgh Courier, the Daily Journal also produces several special publications throughout the year, including special sections, guides and magazines.

- Brave Hearts: Cancer Awareness Special Section
- Business Profiles
- Find the Hummingbird
- Johnson County 4-H & Agricultural Fair
- Johnson County 4-H & Agricultural Fair Souvenir Scrapbook Edition
- Johnson County Agriculture
- Junior Journal
- Letters to Santa Claus
- The New You: A Guide to a Happier, Healthier You
- Salute: A Tribute to Johnson County Area Veterans
- South Magazine
- Year in Review

=== Guides ===
- Fire Prevention and Safety Guide
- Health Guide
- Holiday Guide
- Home Trends
- How To Guide

=== Southside ===
- Southside Back to School
- Southside Boomers
- Southside Business Exchange
- Southside Family
- Southside Neighborhood Cookbook
- Southside Golf Guide
- Southside Outdoors
- Southside Wedding
