= Rushville Republican =

Newspaper in Rushville, Indiana (1840–2020)

- Type: Daily newspaper
- Format: Broadsheet
- Owner(s): CNHI
- Publisher: Pete VanBaalen
- Editor: Kevin Green
- Founded: 1840 (185 years ago)
- Ceased publication: May 15, 2020 (5 years ago)
- Headquarters: 306 North Main Street, Rushville, Indiana 46173 United States
- Circulation: 3,020 (as of February 2006)
- Website: rushvillerepublican.com (defunct)

The Rushville Republican was a two-day (Tuesday and Friday) morning daily newspaper serving Rushville, Indiana, and Rush County. It was owned by CNHI. Its publication was discontinued in May 2020, when it was merged with the CNHI's Greensburg Daily News.

== History ==
Having begun publication as the Rushville Whig in 1840, the Republican claimed to be the oldest daily still operating in Indiana.

On May 15, 2020, the Republican printed its last edition. It was merged with the Greensburg Daily News, making it one of 16 publications shut down by owner CNHI due to business losses associated with the economic impact of the COVID-19 pandemic in the United States.
