= AIM Media Indiana =

- Type: Private (family-owned)
- Industry: Commercial printing and newspapers
- Founded: 1872
- Founder: Isaac T. Brown
- Headquarters: 333 Second Street, Columbus, Indiana 47201, United States
- Area served: Indianapolis metropolitan area and south-central Indiana
- Products: Four daily newspapers and five weeklies
- Website: aimmediaindiana.com

AIM Media Indiana (formerly Home News Enterprises) is an American printer and publisher of daily and weekly newspapers, based in Columbus, Indiana.

Its flagship newspaper is The Republic in Columbus, and its other newspaper holdings also cover small cities and counties south and east of Indianapolis. Not counting its 2012 acquisition of The Tribune, the company boasts an overall circulation of 55,000.

On November 11, 2022, it was announced that Richard Clark would succeed Bud Hunt as vice president and group publisher for AIM Media Indiana, with responsibility for all AIM Media properties within the state.

== History ==
Isaac T. Brown founded The Columbus Republican in 1872. Isaac's father, Isaac M. Brown, served as the newspaper's editor. Isaac T. Brown died in 1917, leaving his son Raymond Brown in sole control of the newspaper.

Raymond Brown converted the company into a partnership with his wife Anna in 1942, and in 1963 expanded the partnership to include their adult children Richard Brown, Robert N. Brown and Elizabeth B. Marshall. The partnership became a limited liability company (LLC) in 1994.

The company began expanding its holdings in 1963, when Robert N. Brown started the Daily Journal in Johnson County, which borders on Columbus' Bartholomew County to the north.

In 1973, Home News acquired The Greenfield Daily Reporter, in Hancock County east of Indianapolis, a year after the death of Dorothea Spencer, whose family had started the paper in 1908.

Home News purchased two competing weekly newspapers in Northern Indiana, the Angola Herald and Steuben Republican, in 1982 and combined them into one newspaper, publishing twice each week. The company held this Angola publication until 2001, when it sold The Herald Republican to KPC Media Group of Kendallville, Indiana, which converted it to a daily newspaper.

Around the same time as the Angola purchase, Home News bought the Herald Journal in Monticello, in north-central Indiana. It sold this paper in 2008 to Community Newspaper Group of West Frankfort, Illinois. At the time, Home News CEO Jeffrey N. Brown said his company wanted to concentrate on "our cluster of newspapers and commercial printing around the Indianapolis and southern Indiana areas".

The company had expanded its footprint in the Columbus area in 2002, buying its neighboring weekly the Brown County Democrat (founded as The Jacksonian in 1870). Five years later it grew its holdings east of Indianapolis with the June 2007 purchase of two weeklies in Madison County, the Lapel Post and The Pendleton Times, which it combined into the Times-Post.

Home News added its latest title in 2012, purchasing The Tribune for an undisclosed sum from California-based publisher Freedom Communications, which was emerging from bankruptcy and selling several of its newspaper assets at the time. The Tribune covers Seymour, Indiana, in Jackson County, which borders Bartholomew County to the south; Home News had been printing The Tribune at its Columbus presses "for several years".

In 2015, all Home News properties were sold to AIM Media Indiana, a sister company of AIM Media Texas. In August 2026, AIM Media Indiana sold its six publications to HD Media.

== Holdings ==
The company operates presses in Columbus and Greenfield, Indiana, both of which offer commercial printing services in addition to printing Home News' own newspapers. It also has editorial and business offices in Columbus, Franklin, Nashville, Pendleton and Seymour, all in Indiana (its Greenfield newspaper offices are in the same building as the presses).

AIM Media Indiana's newspapers are:

- Daily Journal of Franklin and its sister weekly:
  - Edinburgh Courier of Edinburgh
- Daily Reporter of Greenfield and its sister weeklies:
  - Fortville/McCordsville Reporter of Fortville
  - New Palestine Reporter of New Palestine
- The Republic of Columbus
- The Tribune of Seymour
- Other weekly newspapers:
  - Brown County Democrat of Nashville
  - Times-Post of Pendleton
