= Newspaper endorsements in the 1992 United States presidential election =

The following table is the list of newspaper endorsements in the 1992 United States presidential election. It mostly contains major and small city newspapers of 1992, which made their presidential endorsement from September–November 1992. Many newspaper, who had made their endorsement for George H. W. Bush in 1988 presidential election endorsed Bill Clinton in the 1992 election. The Hartford Courant and The Oregonian both endorsed their first Democratic presidential endorsement in its 228 and 142 years of continuous publication, respectively. The Wisconsin State Journal also endorsed Clinton as their first Democratic endorsement since Woodrow Wilson in 1916.

== List ==
Newspaper	1992 endorsement	Endorsement date	City	State	Type	1988 endorsement	Reference(s)	
Newspaper	1992 endorsement	Endorsement date	City	State	Type	1988 endorsement	1992	1988
Abilene Reporter-News	None	October 25	Abilene	Texas	Daily	George H. W. Bush		
Agri News	Bill Clinton	October 29	Rochester	Minnesota	Weekly	Michael Dukakis		
Akron Beacon Journal	Bill Clinton	October 25	Akron	Ohio	Daily	George H. W. Bush		
The Alabama Journal	George H. W. Bush	October 20	Montgomery	Alabama	Daily	George H. W. Bush		
Albany Democrat-Herald	None	October 28	Albany	Oregon	Daily	George H. W. Bush		
Albuquerque Journal	George H. W. Bush	October 25	Albuquerque	New Mexico	Daily	George H. W. Bush		
The Ann Arbor News	Bill Clinton	October 25	Ann Arbor	Michigan	Daily	Michael Dukakis		
Argus Leader	Bill Clinton	October 25	Sioux Falls	South Dakota	Daily	Michael Dukakis		
The Arizona Daily Star	Bill Clinton	October 11	Tucson	Arizona	Daily	Michael Dukakis		
The Arizona Republic	George H. W. Bush	October 24	Phoenix	Arizona	Daily	George H. W. Bush		
Arkansas Democrat-Gazette	None	October 29	Little Rock	Arkansas	Daily	Michael Dukakis (Note: Although Arkansas Democrat-Gazette didn't directly endorse Michael Dukakis, its editorial board was more impressed with Dukakis' record, calling him "a leader who is not afraid to confront some of most perplexing problems inherent in this challenge.")		
Asbury Park Press	Bill Clinton	October 26	Asbury Park	New Jersey	Daily	George H. W. Bush		
The Atlanta Constitution	Bill Clinton	October 21	Atlanta	Georgia	Daily	Michael Dukakis		
The Atlanta Journal	George H. W. Bush	October 30	Atlanta	Georgia	Daily	George H. W. Bush		
Austin American-Statesman	Bill Clinton	October 25	Austin	Texas	Daily	Michael Dukakis		
The Baltimore Sun	None	October 4	Baltimore	Maryland	Daily	None		
Bangor Daily News	George H. W. Bush	October 31	Bangor	Maine	Daily	George H. W. Bush		
Battle Creek Enquirer	Bill Clinton	October 25	Battle Creek	Michigan	Daily	George H. W. Bush		
The Bay City Times	Bill Clinton	October 27	Bay City	Michigan	Daily	George H. W. Bush		
Beatrice Daily Sun	George H. W. Bush	November 2	Beatrice	Nebraska	Daily	George H. W. Bush		
Beaumont Enterprise	George H. W. Bush	October 25	Beaumont	Texas	Daily	George H. W. Bush		
Belleville News-Democrat	George H. W. Bush	October 25	Belleville	Illinois	Daily	George H. W. Bush		
The Bellingham Herald	Bill Clinton	October 25	Bellingham	Washington	Daily	Michael Dukakis		
Bennington Banner	Bill Clinton	November 2	Bennington	Vermont	Daily	Unknown		
Billings Gazette	George H. W. Bush	October 26	Billings	Montana	Daily	George H. W. Bush		
The Birmingham News	George H. W. Bush	November 3	Birmingham	Alabama	Daily	George H. W. Bush		
Birmingham Post-Herald (Note: The E.W. Scripps Company has endorsed the candidate on behalf of the paper.)	George H. W. Bush	October 12	Birmingham	Alabama	Daily	George H. W. Bush		
The Blade	Bill Clinton	November 2	Toledo	Ohio	Daily	George H. W. Bush		
The Boston Globe	Bill Clinton	October 24	Boston	Massachusetts	Daily	Michael Dukakis		
Boston Herald	George H. W. Bush	October 29	Boston	Massachusetts	Daily	George H. W. Bush		
Bridgeton Evening News	Bill Clinton	October 28	Bridgeton	New Jersey	Daily	None		
The Buffalo News	Bill Clinton	October 25	Buffalo	New York	Daily	Michael Dukakis		
The Casper Star-Tribune	George H. W. Bush	October 31	Casper	Wyoming	Daily	Unknown		
The Central New Jersey Home News	Bill Clinton	October 25	New Brunswick	New Jersey	Daily	George H. W. Bush		
Centre Daily Times	Bill Clinton	October 25	State College	Pennsylvania	Daily	Michael Dukakis		
The Charlotte Observer	Bill Clinton	October 11	Charlotte	North Carolina	Daily	Michael Dukakis		
Chicago Sun-Times	Bill Clinton	October 24	Chicago	Illinois	Daily	George H. W. Bush		
Chicago Tribune	George H. W. Bush	October 18	Chicago	Illinois	Daily	George H. W. Bush		
Chippewa Herald-Telegram	Ross Perot	October 25	Chippewa Falls	Wisconsin	Daily	Unknown		
Chronicle Tribune	Bill Clinton	November 1	Marion	Indiana	Daily	None		
The Cincinnati Enquirer	George H. W. Bush	October 25	Cincinnati	Ohio	Daily	George H. W. Bush		
The Cincinnati Post	George H. W. Bush	October 12	Cincinnati	Ohio	Daily	George H. W. Bush		
Citizens' Voice	Bill Clinton	October 23	Wilkes-Barre	Pennsylvania	Daily	Unknown		
Citrus County Chronicle	George H. W. Bush	November 1	Inverness	Florida	Daily	George H. W. Bush		
The Clarion-Ledger	Bill Clinton	November 1	Jackson	Mississippi	Daily	George H. W. Bush		
The Columbian	Bill Clinton	October 25	Vancouver	Washington	Daily	Michael Dukakis		
The Columbus Dispatch	George H. W. Bush	October 25	Columbus	Ohio	Daily	George H. W. Bush		
The Commercial Appeal	George H. W. Bush	October 11	Memphis	Tennessee	Daily	George H. W. Bush		
Concord Monitor	Bill Clinton	October 29	Concord	New Hampshire	Daily	Michael Dukakis		
Connecticut Post	Ross Perot	October 25	Bridgeport	Connecticut	Daily	Unknown		
Corpus Christi Caller-Times	Bill Clinton	October 25	Corpus Christi	Texas	Daily	George H. W. Bush		
The Courier	George H. W. Bush	October 28	Houma	Louisiana	Daily	Unknown		
The Courier-Journal	Bill Clinton	October 11	Louisville	Kentucky	Daily	Michael Dukakis		
Courier-Post	Bill Clinton	October 18	Cherry Hill	New Jersey	Daily	George H. W. Bush		
The Daily Advertiser	Bill Clinton	November 1	Lafayette	Louisiana	Daily	Unknown		
The Daily Astorian	Bill Clinton	October 23	Astoria	Oregon	Daily	Michael Dukakis		
Daily Evening Item	George H. W. Bush	October 30	Lynn	Massachusetts	Daily	George H. W. Bush		
Daily Herald	None	October 29	Chicago	Illinois	Daily	George H. W. Bush		
Daily Mountain Eagle	Bill Clinton	October 24	Jasper	Alabama	Daily	George H. W. Bush		
The Daily News	George H. W. Bush	October 30	Bowling Green	Kentucky	Daily	George H. W. Bush		
Daily News	Bill Clinton (Note: New York Daily News's endorsement of Bill Clinton was their first Democratic endorsement since Franklin Roosevelt in 1940.)	October 25	New York City	New York	Daily	George H. W. Bush		
The Daily Nonpareil	Bill Clinton	November 1	Council Bluffs	Iowa	Daily	George H. W. Bush		
The Daily Oklahoman	George H. W. Bush	October 18	Oklahoma City	Oklahoma	Daily	George H. W. Bush		
Daily Record	Bill Clinton	November 1	Parsippany	New Jersey	Daily	George H. W. Bush		
The Daily Times	Bill Clinton	October 25	Salisbury	Maryland	Daily	Michael Dukakis		
The Dallas Morning News	George H. W. Bush	October 11	Dallas	Texas	Daily	George H. W. Bush		
Danville Register & Bee	George H. W. Bush	October 25	Danville	Virginia	Daily	George H. W. Bush		
The Day	Bill Clinton	October 25	New London	Connecticut	Daily	Michael Dukakis		
Dayton Daily News	Bill Clinton	October 11	Dayton	Ohio	Daily	Michael Dukakis		
Democrat and Chronicle	Bill Clinton	October 18	Rochester	New York	Daily	Michael Dukakis		
The Denver Post	Bill Clinton	October 25	Denver	Colorado	Daily	George H. W. Bush		
The Des Moines Register	Bill Clinton	October 25	Des Moines	Iowa	Daily	Michael Dukakis		
Detroit Free Press	Bill Clinton	October 24	Detroit	Michigan	Daily	Michael Dukakis		
The Detroit News	George H. W. Bush	October 11	Detroit	Michigan	Daily	George H. W. Bush		
East Oregonian	Bill Clinton	October 30	Pendleton	Oregon	Daily	Michael Dukakis		
Edwardsburg Argus	Bill Clinton	October 22	Edwardsburg	Michigan	Weekly	Unknown		
The Elkhart Truth	George H. W. Bush	October 30	Elkhart	Indiana	Daily	George H. W. Bush		
El Nuevo Herald	None	October 25	Miami	Florida	Daily	Unknown		
Elko Daily Free Press	George H. W. Bush	October 28	Elko	Nevada	Daily	Unknown		
Florence Morning News	None	November 1	Florence	South Carolina	Daily	Unknown		
The Florida Times-Union	George H. W. Bush	October 18	Jacksonville	Florida	Daily	George H. W. Bush		
Florida Today	Bill Clinton	October 25	Melbourne	Florida	Daily	George H. W. Bush		
Fort Worth Star-Telegram	Bill Clinton	October 18	Fort Worth	Texas	Daily	George H. W. Bush		
The Forum	George H. W. Bush	October 25	Fargo	North Dakota	Daily	George H. W. Bush		
The Fresno Bee	Bill Clinton	October 20	Fresno	California	Daily	Michael Dukakis		
The Gazette	Ross Perot	October 25	Cedar Rapids	Iowa	Daily	George H. W. Bush		
Grand Forks Herald	Bill Clinton	October 18	Grand Forks	North Dakota	Daily	Michael Dukakis		
Grand Haven Tribune	Bill Clinton	October 26	Grand Haven	Michigan	Daily	George H. W. Bush		
The Grand Rapids Press	Bill Clinton	October 21	Grand Rapids	Michigan	Daily	George H. W. Bush		
Green Bay Press-Gazette	None	October 12	Green Bay	Wisconsin	Daily	Michael Dukakis		
The Greenville News	George H. W. Bush	October 25	Greenville	South Carolina	Daily	George H. W. Bush		
The Greenwood Commonwealth	Bill Clinton	November 1	Greenwood	Mississippi	Daily	Michael Dukakis		
The Hammond Times	George H. W. Bush	November 1	Munster	Indiana	Daily	George H. W. Bush		
Hartford Courant	Bill Clinton (Note: Hartford Courant's 1992 endorsement of Clinton was their first Democratic presidential endorsement in its 228 years of continuous publication.)	October 27	Hartford	Connecticut	Daily	George H. W. Bush		
Hawaii Tribune-Herald	Bill Clinton	November 2	Hilo	Hawaii	Daily	None		
Herald-Star	George H. W. Bush	October 29	Steubenville	Ohio	Daily	Unknown		
The Herald	Bill Clinton	November 1	Monterey	California	Daily	George H. W. Bush		
The Herald	Bill Clinton	October 18	Everett	Washington	Daily	George H. W. Bush		
High Point Enterprise	George H. W. Bush	October 18	High Point	North Carolina	Daily	George H. W. Bush		
The Honolulu Advertiser	None	October 25	Honolulu	Hawaii	Daily	None		
Honolulu Star-Bulletin	Bill Clinton	October 29	Honolulu	Hawaii	Daily	Michael Dukakis		
Houston Chronicle	George H. W. Bush	October 26	Houston	Texas	Daily	George H. W. Bush		
The Houston Post	George H. W. Bush	October 25	Houston	Texas	Daily	George H. W. Bush		
The Huntsville Times	George H. W. Bush	October 25	Huntsville	Alabama	Daily	George H. W. Bush		
The Idaho Statesman	George H. W. Bush	October 30	Boise	Idaho	Daily	George H. W. Bush		
The Indianapolis Star	George H. W. Bush	November 1	Indianapolis	Indiana	Daily	George H. W. Bush		
The Indianapolis News	George H. W. Bush	October 29	Indianapolis	Indiana	Daily	Unknown		
Intelligencer Journal	Bill Clinton	October 22	Lancaster	Pennsylvania	Daily	Michael Dukakis		
The Jersey Journal	Bill Clinton	October 23	Jersey City	New Jersey	Daily	Michael Dukakis		
Johnson City Press	Bill Clinton	October 28	Johnson City	Tennessee	Daily	George H. W. Bush		
Journal and Courier	George H. W. Bush	October 27	Lafayette	Indiana	Daily	Michael Dukakis		
Journal Star	Bill Clinton	November 1	Peoria	Illinois	Daily	Michael Dukakis		
The Journal Times	Bill Clinton	November 1	Racine	Wisconsin	Daily	George H. W. Bush		
Juneau Empire	Bill Clinton	October 25	Juneau	Alaska	Daily	George H. W. Bush		
Kalamazoo Gazette	Bill Clinton	November 1	Kalamazoo	Michigan	Daily	Michael Dukakis		
The Kansas City Star	Bill Clinton	October 25	Kansas City	Missouri	Daily	Michael Dukakis		
Kennebec Journal	Bill Clinton	October 26	Augusta	Maine	Daily	George H. W. Bush		
Kenosha News	Bill Clinton	November 1	Kenosha	Wisconsin	Daily	Michael Dukakis		
The Kentucky Advocate	George H. W. Bush	November 1	Danville	Kentucky	Daily	George H. W. Bush		
Kentucky New Era	George H. W. Bush	October 28	Hopkinsville	Kentucky	Daily	George H. W. Bush		
Kingsport Times-News	George H. W. Bush	October 23	Kingsport	Tennessee	Daily	George H. W. Bush		
Knoxville News Sentinel	George H. W. Bush	October 11	Knoxville	Tennessee	Daily	George H. W. Bush		
La Crosse Tribune	Bill Clinton	October 25	La Crosse	Wisconsin	Daily	George H. W. Bush		
La Opinión	Bill Clinton	October 24	Los Angeles	California	Daily	Michael Dukakis		
Lake Charles American Press	George H. W. Bush	October 25	Lake Charles	Louisiana	Daily	George H. W. Bush		
Las Cruces Sun-News	George H. W. Bush	October 28	Las Cruces	New Mexico	Daily	George H. W. Bush		
The Leader	Bill Clinton	October 25	Corning	New York	Daily	George H. W. Bush		
Leader-Telegram	Bill Clinton	November 1	Eau Claire	Wisconsin	Daily	George H. W. Bush		
The Leaf-Chronicle	George H. W. Bush	October 18	Clarksville	Tennessee	Daily	George H. W. Bush		
The Ledger	Bill Clinton	October 25	Lakeland	Florida	Daily	George H. W. Bush		
Lexington Herald-Leader	Bill Clinton	October 25	Lexington	Kentucky	Daily	Michael Dukakis		
Lincoln Journal	Bill Clinton	October 19	Lincoln	Nebraska	Daily	None		
The Lincoln Star	Bill Clinton	October 22	Lincoln	Nebraska	Daily	Michael Dukakis		
Los Angeles Times	None	(Note: Los Angeles Times didn't formally announce its endorsement for 1988 and 1992 presidential election.)	Los Angeles	California	Daily	None		
The Miami Herald	None	November 1	Miami	Florida	Daily	George H. W. Bush		
Midland Daily News	George H. W. Bush	October 25	Midland	Michigan	Daily	George H. W. Bush		
Midland Reporter-Telegram	George H. W. Bush	October 25	Midland	Texas	Daily	George H. W. Bush		
Missoulian	George H. W. Bush	November 1	Missoula	Montana	Daily	George H. W. Bush		
Milwaukee Journal	Split (Note: The Milwaukee Journal made endorsements for both Bill Clinton and George H. W. Bush.)	October 24	Milwaukee	Wisconsin	Daily	Michael Dukakis		
The Modesto Bee (Note: The Modesto Bee and The Sacramento Bee used the same editorial statement.)	Bill Clinton	October 4	Modesto	California	Daily	Michael Dukakis		
The Montana Standard	Bill Clinton	October 30	Butte	Montana	Daily	Michael Dukakis		
The Monterey County Herald	Bill Clinton	November 1	Monterey	California	Daily	George H. W. Bush		
The Morning Call	Bill Clinton	October 25	Allentown	Pennsylvania	Daily	George H. W. Bush		
Morning Sentinel	Bill Clinton	October 28	Waterville	Maine	Daily	George H. W. Bush		
Morning Star and Wilmington News	Bill Clinton	October 25	Wilmington	North Carolina	Daily	George H. W. Bush		
The Muskegon Chronicle	Bill Clinton (Note: The Muskegon Chronicle's 1992 endorsement of Clinton was their first Democratic presidential endorsement in 50 years.)	November 1	Muskegon	Michigan	Daily	George H. W. Bush		
New York Post	George H. W. Bush	October 24 - November 3	New York City	New York	Daily	George H. W. Bush		
The New York Times	Bill Clinton	October 25	New York City	New York	Daily	Michael Dukakis		
The News & Observer	Bill Clinton	November 1	Raleigh	North Carolina	Daily	Michael Dukakis		
News & Record	Bill Clinton	November 1	Greensboro	North Carolina	Daily	Michael Dukakis		
The News-Journal	Bill Clinton	October 11	Daytona Beach	Florida	Daily	Michael Dukakis		
News-Press	George H. W. Bush	November 1	Fort Myers	Florida	Daily	George H. W. Bush		
The News-Star	George H. W. Bush	October 25	Monroe	Louisiana	Daily	George H. W. Bush		
The News-Times	Bill Clinton	November 1	Danbury	Connecticut	Daily	Michael Dukakis		
Newsday	Bill Clinton	October 18	Melville	New York	Daily	Michael Dukakis		
North Platte Telegraph	George H. W. Bush	October 21	North Platte	Nebraska	Daily	None		
The Odessa American	None	October 30	Odessa	Texas	Daily	None		
Omaha World-Herald	George H. W. Bush	October 25	Omaha	Nebraska	Daily	George H. W. Bush		
The Oregonian	Bill Clinton (Note: The Oregonian's 1992 endorsement of Clinton was their first Democratic presidential endorsement in its 142 years of continuous publication.)	October 18	Portland	Oregon	Daily	George H. W. Bush		
The Orlando Sentinel	George H. W. Bush	October 25	Orlando	Florida	Daily	George H. W. Bush		
The Palm Beach Post	Bill Clinton	October 25	West Palm Beach	Florida	Daily	Michael Dukakis		
The Paris Post-Intelligencer	Bill Clinton	October 27	Paris	Tennessee	Daily	George H. W. Bush		
The Patriot and Evening News	Bill Clinton	October 25	Harrisburg	Pennsylvania	Daily	George H. W. Bush		
Philadelphia Daily News	Bill Clinton	October 12	Philadelphia	Pennsylvania	Daily	Michael Dukakis		
The Philadelphia Inquirer	Bill Clinton	October 25	Philadelphia	Pennsylvania	Daily	Michael Dukakis		
Pittsburgh Post-Gazette	Bill Clinton	October 20	Pittsburgh	Pennsylvania	Daily	Michael Dukakis		
The Plain Dealer	Bill Clinton	October 25	Cleveland	Ohio	Daily	George H. W. Bush		
Plainview Daily Herald	George H. W. Bush	October 25	Plainview	Texas	Daily	George H. W. Bush		
Portland Press Herald	George H. W. Bush	October 25	Portland	Maine	Daily	George H. W. Bush		
Post-Bulletin	Bill Clinton	November 4	Rochester	Minnesota	Daily	Michael Dukakis		
The Press	Bill Clinton	October 29	Atlantic City	New Jersey	Daily	None		
Quad-City Times	Bill Clinton	November 1	Davenport	Iowa	Daily	George H. W. Bush		
The Quincy Herald-Whig	George H. W. Bush	October 28	Quincy	Illinois	Daily	George H. W. Bush		
Rapid City Journal	George H. W. Bush	November 1	Rapid City	South Dakota	Daily	Michael Dukakis		
The Recorder	Bill Clinton	October 25	Greenfield	Massachusetts	Daily	Michael Dukakis		
The Record	George H. W. Bush	October 25	Hackensack	New Jersey	Daily	George H. W. Bush		
Record-Journal	Bill Clinton	October 28	Meriden	Connecticut	Daily	None		
The Register-Guard	Bill Clinton	October 28	Eugene	Oregon	Daily	Michael Dukakis		
Richmond Times-Dispatch	George H. W. Bush	October 18	Richmond	Virginia	Daily	George H. W. Bush		
Roanoke Times & World-News	Bill Clinton	October 30	Roanoke	Virginia	Daily	Michael Dukakis		
Rockford Register Star	Bill Clinton	October 25	Rockford	Illinois	Daily	Michael Dukakis		
The Sacramento Bee	Bill Clinton	October 4	Sacramento	California	Daily	Michael Dukakis		
The Saginaw News	George H. W. Bush	October 25	Saginaw	Michigan	Daily	George H. W. Bush		
San Antonio Express-News	George H. W. Bush	October 11	San Antonio	Texas	Daily	George H. W. Bush		
San Antonio Light	George H. W. Bush	October 25	San Antonio	Texas	Daily	George H. W. Bush		
The San Diego Union-Tribune	George H. W. Bush	October 22	San Diego	California	Daily	George H. W. Bush		
San Francisco Chronicle	George H. W. Bush	October 30	San Francisco	California	Daily	George H. W. Bush		
San Francisco Examiner	Bill Clinton	October 11	San Francisco	California	Daily	George H. W. Bush		
Santa Barbara News-Press	Bill Clinton	October 25	Santa Barbara	California	Daily	George H. W. Bush		
The Santa Fe New Mexican	Bill Clinton	November 1	Santa Fe	New Mexico	Daily	Michael Dukakis		
Santa Maria Times	George H. W. Bush	October 26	Santa Maria	California	Daily	George H. W. Bush		
Sarasota Herald-Tribune	Bill Clinton	October 25	Sarasota	Florida	Daily	George H. W. Bush		
Seattle Post-Intelligencer	Bill Clinton	October 18	Seattle	Washington	Daily	George H. W. Bush		
The Seattle Times	Bill Clinton	October 19	Seattle	Washington	Daily	Michael Dukakis		
The Sheboygan Press	Bill Clinton	November 1	Sheboygan	Wisconsin	Daily	George H. W. Bush		
The Sioux City Journal	George H. W. Bush	November 1	Sioux City	Iowa	Daily	George H. W. Bush		
South Bend Tribune	Bill Clinton	November 1	South Bend	Indiana	Daily	Michael Dukakis		
Southern Illinoisan	George H. W. Bush	October 18	Carbondale	Illinois	Daily	Michael Dukakis		
Southwest Times Record	Bill Clinton	October 18	Fort Smith	Arkansas	Daily	George H. W. Bush		
The Spokesman-Review	Bill Clinton	October 18	Spokane	Washington	Daily	George H. W. Bush		
Springfield News-Leader	Bill Clinton	October 16	Springfield	Missouri	Daily	George H. W. Bush		
Springfield News-Sun	Bill Clinton	October 25	Springfield	Ohio	Daily	George H. W. Bush		
St. Joseph News-Press	George H. W. Bush	October 25	St. Joseph	Missouri	Daily	George H. W. Bush		
St. Louis Post-Dispatch	Bill Clinton	September 20	St. Louis	Missouri	Daily	Michael Dukakis		
Saint Paul Pioneer Press	Bill Clinton	October 19	Saint Paul	Minnesota	Daily	None		
St. Petersburg Times	Bill Clinton	October 25	St. Petersburg	Florida	Daily	Michael Dukakis		
Star-Herald	Bill Clinton	October 25	Scottsbluff	Nebraska	Daily	George H. W. Bush		
Star Tribune	Bill Clinton	October 25	Minneapolis	Minnesota	Daily	Michael Dukakis		
The Star-Ledger	Bill Clinton	October 26	Newark	New Jersey	Daily	George H. W. Bush		
The State	George H. W. Bush	October 30	Columbia	South Carolina	Daily	George H. W. Bush		
The State Journal-Register	George H. W. Bush	October 25	Springfield	Illinois	Daily	George H. W. Bush		
Staten Island Advance	Bill Clinton	October 25	Staten Island	New York	Daily	Michael Dukakis		
Statesman Journal	Bill Clinton	October 21	Salem	Oregon	Daily	Michael Dukakis		
Sun-Sentinel	George H. W. Bush	October 25	Fort Lauderdale	Florida	Daily	George H. W. Bush		
Syracuse Herald American	Ross Perot	October 25	Syracuse	New York	Daily	George H. W. Bush		
Tallahassee Democrat	Bill Clinton	October 18	Tallahassee	Florida	Daily	Michael Dukakis		
The Tampa Tribune	George H. W. Bush	October 19	Tampa	Florida	Daily	George H. W. Bush		
Telegram & Gazette	George H. W. Bush	November 1	Worcester	Massachusetts	Daily	George H. W. Bush		
The Tennessean	Bill Clinton	October 25	Nashville	Tennessee	Daily	Michael Dukakis		
TimesDaily	Bill Clinton	October 25	Florence	Alabama	Daily	Michael Dukakis		
Times Record News	George H. W. Bush	October 25	Wichita Falls	Texas	Daily	George H. W. Bush		
Times Union	Bill Clinton	November 1	Albany	New York	Daily	George H. W. Bush		
Times-Union	Bill Clinton	October 26	Rochester	New York	Daily	Michael Dukakis		
The Times-Picayune	George H. W. Bush	October 26	New Orleans	Louisiana	Daily	George H. W. Bush		
Tri-City Herald	Bill Clinton	October 20	Pasco	Washington	Daily	George H. W. Bush		
Tulsa World	George H. W. Bush	October 24	Tulsa	Oklahoma	Daily	George H. W. Bush		
Tucson Citizen	George H. W. Bush	October 30	Tucson	Arizona	Daily	George H. W. Bush		
Tyler Courier-Times-Telegraph	George H. W. Bush	October 25	Tyler	Texas	Daily	George H. W. Bush		
The Union	George H. W. Bush	October 11	Sacramento	California	Daily	George H. W. Bush		
USA Today	None	(Note: USA Today didn't make any presidential endorsement, until 2016.)	Tysons	Virginia	Daily	None		
The Victoria Advocate	George H. W. Bush	October 9	Victoria	Texas	Daily	George H. W. Bush		
The Vindicator	Bill Clinton	November 2	Youngstown	Ohio	Daily	George H. W. Bush		
The Virginian-Pilot	Bill Clinton	October 26	Norfolk	Virginia	Daily	George H. W. Bush		
The Wall Street Journal	None	(Note: Wall Street Journal has never made any presidential endorsement.)	New York City	New York	Daily	None		
Walla Walla Union-Bulletin	Bill Clinton	October 11	Walla Walla	Washington	Daily	George H. W. Bush		
The Washington Post	Bill Clinton	October 12	Washington D.C.		Daily	None		
Waterloo Courier	None	November 1	Waterloo	Iowa	Daily	None		
Wausau Daily Herald	Bill Clinton	November 1	Wausau	Wisconsin	Daily	Michael Dukakis		
The West Central Tribune	None	October 23	Willmar	Minnesota	Daily	George H. W. Bush		
The Wichita Eagle	Bill Clinton	October 25	Wichita	Kansas	Daily	Michael Dukakis		
Wilmington News Journal	Bill Clinton	November 1	Wilmington	Ohio	Daily	Michael Dukakis		
Wisconsin State Journal	Bill Clinton (Note: Wisconsin State Journal's 1992 endorsement of Clinton was their first Democratic presidential endorsement since Woodrow Wilson in 1916.)	October 29	Madison	Wisconsin	Daily	George H. W. Bush		

== See also ==
- 1992 United States presidential election
- Bill Clinton 1992 presidential campaign
- George H. W. Bush 1992 presidential campaign
- Ross Perot 1992 presidential campaign
- Newspaper endorsements in the 1996 United States presidential election

== Notes and references ==
=== Work cited ===
"Editor & Publisher". Editor & Publisher. 125 (43). Duncan McIntosh Company. October 24, 1992 – via Internet Archive.
