= Daily newspaper endorsements in the 2016 United States presidential election =

Various notable daily newspapers made endorsements of candidates in the 2016 United States presidential election, as follows. The table below indicates which candidate each publication endorsed in the 2012 United States presidential election and includes only endorsements for the general election.

== Daily newspapers ==
=== Summary of daily newspapers ===
Candidate	Endorsements	Breakdown by 2012 endorsement
Hillary Clinton	244	100 Barack Obama; 47 Mitt Romney; 19 no endorsement; 1 split endorsement; 76 undetermined
No endorsement	65	38 Mitt Romney; 2 Barack Obama; 2 no endorsement; 11 undetermined
Donald Trump	20	14 Mitt Romney; 6 undetermined
Gary Johnson	9	2 Barack Obama; 5 Mitt Romney; 2 undetermined
Not Donald Trump	8	2 Mitt Romney; 1 Barack Obama; 4 no endorsement; 1 undetermined
Split endorsement	2	2 split endorsement
Evan McMullin	1	1 undetermined
Not Hillary Clinton	1	1 undetermined

=== Endorsements by daily newspapers ===
Newspaper	2016 endorsement	Largest reported circulation	Endorsement date	City	State	2012 endorsement	Notes
New York Daily News	Hillary Clinton	312,736	July 28	New York City	New York	Mitt Romney	(Note: The Daily News's editorial stance is usually identified as "flexibly centrist" with a populist streak. The paper endorsed George W. Bush in 2004, Barack Obama in 2008, and Mitt Romney in 2012. On November 1, the Daily News published an additional editorial "doubling down" on their endorsement, because "it's that important".)
Houston Chronicle	Hillary Clinton	925,085	July 29	Houston	Texas	Mitt Romney	(Note: This was the third time in 64 years that the Chronicle endorsed a Democratic nominee for president. The previous times were 2008 (Barack Obama) and 1964 (Texan Lyndon Johnson).)
San Francisco Chronicle	Hillary Clinton	277,909	August 5	San Francisco	California	Barack Obama	
Tulsa World	No endorsement	95,063	August 8	Tulsa	Oklahoma	Mitt Romney	(Note: This marked a break from the World's traditional practice of endorsing the Republican nominee; it last endorsed a Democrat for president in 1940 (Franklin Roosevelt).)
The Caledonian-Record	Gary Johnson	10,204	August 9	St. Johnsbury	Vermont		
The Press Democrat	Hillary Clinton	50,669	August 21	Santa Rosa	California	No endorsement	
Richmond Times-Dispatch	Gary Johnson	109,345	September 3	Richmond	Virginia	Mitt Romney	(Note: This was the Times-Dispatch's first endorsement of a Libertarian. They have endorsed the Republican nominee in every election since 1980. The newspaper published an additional editorial on October 29, confirming that Johnson remains the newspaper's best choice for president.)
The Berkshire Eagle	Hillary Clinton	32,612	September 3	Pittsfield	Massachusetts	Barack Obama	
The Dallas Morning News	Hillary Clinton	707,792	September 6	Dallas	Texas	Mitt Romney	(Note: This was the Morning News's first endorsement of a Democrat for president since 1944 (Franklin Roosevelt).)
Daily Camera	Hillary Clinton	19,459	September 10	Boulder	Colorado	Barack Obama	
Winston-Salem Journal	Gary Johnson	62,283	September 11	Winston-Salem	North Carolina	Barack Obama	(Note: This was the Journal's first endorsement of a Libertarian for president.)
New Hampshire Union Leader	Gary Johnson	48,468	September 15	Manchester	New Hampshire	Mitt Romney	(Note: This was the Union Leader's first endorsement of a Libertarian for president, and their first endorsement for a non-Republican in over 100 years. On November 5, the Union Leader published an additional editorial re-affirming their support of Johnson.)
The Repository	No endorsement	54,649	September 18	Canton	Ohio	No endorsement	(Note: The Repository has a bipartisan endorsement record since 1980, but did not endorse any candidate in the two most recent elections. An identical editorial ran in The (Massillon) Independent.)
Los Angeles Times	Hillary Clinton	965,598	September 23	Los Angeles	California	Barack Obama	(Note: The Times endorsed Republican candidates until 1972, then discontinued endorsements until backing Obama in 2008 and 2012.)
The Cincinnati Enquirer	Hillary Clinton	207,968	September 23	Cincinnati	Ohio	Mitt Romney	(Note: The Enquirer had not endorsed a Democrat for president since 1916 (Woodrow Wilson). On November 2, the Enquirer published an additional editorial, re-affirming their endorsement.)
Akron Beacon Journal	Hillary Clinton	96,516	September 24	Akron	Ohio	Barack Obama	
The New York Times	Hillary Clinton	1,119,112	September 24	New York City	New York	Barack Obama	(Note: The Times took the additional step of publishing an editorial entitled "Why Donald Trump Should Not Be President.")
Portland Press Herald	Hillary Clinton	57,500	September 25	Portland	Maine		(Note: This same editorial that appeared in the Portland Press Herald also appeared on the same day in the Augusta, Maine Kennebec Journal)
Kennebec Journal	Hillary Clinton	8,696	September 25	Augusta	Maine		
The Arizona Republic	Hillary Clinton	496,390	September 27	Phoenix	Arizona	Mitt Romney	(Note: This was the first time in the Republic's 126-year history that the paper had endorsed a Democrat for president.)
The Detroit News	Gary Johnson	146,962	September 29	Detroit	Michigan	Mitt Romney	(Note: This was The Detroit News's first endorsement for a non-Republican in their 143-year history. The paper refrained from making an endorsement in three other presidential elections: twice when Franklin Roosevelt was running, and in 2004.)
The Baltimore Sun	Hillary Clinton	239,354	September 29	Baltimore	Maryland	Barack Obama	
USA Today	Not Donald Trump	3,866,618	September 29	National	National	No endorsement	(Note: USA Today published an editorial urging readers not to vote for Donald Trump, marking the first time the newspaper had taken a position in a presidential election in its 34-year history.)
Sun-Sentinel	Hillary Clinton	210,856	September 30	Fort Lauderdale	Florida	Mitt Romney	(Note: The Sun-Sentinel also published an editorial entitled "Why Trump Is a Terrible Choice.")
Chicago Tribune	Gary Johnson	769,215	September 30	Chicago	Illinois	Barack Obama	(Note: This was the Tribune's first endorsement of a Libertarian for president, and first for a third party since 1912 (former Republican Theodore Roosevelt). Traditionally a Republican paper, it endorsed Obama in 2008 and 2012.)
The San Diego Union-Tribune	Hillary Clinton	334,723	September 30	San Diego	California	Mitt Romney	(Note: This was the first time in the Union-Tribune's 148-year history that the paper had endorsed a Democrat for president.)
Chicago Sun-Times	Hillary Clinton	419,364	September 30	Chicago	Illinois	No endorsement	(Note: The Sun-Times published an additional editorial on November 4 reinforcing their endorsement of Clinton.)
El Paso Times	Hillary Clinton	42,855	September 30	El Paso	Texas	Barack Obama	
Asheville Citizen-Times	Hillary Clinton	43,096	September 30	Asheville	North Carolina	Barack Obama	
The Desert Sun	Hillary Clinton	34,114	September 30	Palm Springs	California	Mitt Romney	(Note: This marked the first time in the Desert Sun's 90-year history that the newspaper had endorsed a Democrat for president.)
The Sacramento Bee	Hillary Clinton	211,941	September 30	Sacramento	California	Barack Obama	
The Courier	No endorsement	15,997	October 1	Findlay	Ohio	Mitt Romney	(Note: This was the first time in many decades that The Courier had not endorsed the Republican candidate.)
Corpus Christi Caller-Times	Hillary Clinton	41,618	October 1	Corpus Christi	Texas	No endorsement	(Note: The Caller-Times endorsed McCain in 2008.)
The Charlotte Observer	Hillary Clinton	161,836	October 1	Charlotte	North Carolina	Barack Obama	
The Spectrum	No endorsement	14,545	October 1	St. George	Utah		(Note: St. George Spectrum and Daily News is part of the USA Today network, but published an independent decision to not endorse.)
San Antonio Express-News	Hillary Clinton	356,401	October 2	San Antonio	Texas	Barack Obama	
The News-Gazette	No endorsement	39,893	October 2	Champaign-Urbana	Illinois	Mitt Romney	
The Spokesman-Review	Hillary Clinton	70,476	October 2	Spokane	Washington	Mitt Romney	
Waco Tribune-Herald	No endorsement	36,065	October 2	Waco	Texas	Mitt Romney	(Note: The Tribune-Herald's opinion editor states that the editorial board stands by its previous endorsement of John Kasich during the Republican primary and declines to endorse a candidate in the general election.)
The Bakersfield Californian	No endorsement	38,868	October 3	Bakersfield	California	No endorsement	
Florida Today	No endorsement	80,656	October 3	Melbourne	Florida	Mitt Romney	(Note: Florida Today is part of the USA Today network, but published an independent decision to not endorse.)
Austin American-Statesman	No endorsement	122,361	October 4	Austin	Texas	No endorsement	(Note: The Austin American-Statesman endorsed Bush in 2000 and 2004, Obama in 2008, but declined to endorse in 2012 and 2016.)
Tampa Bay Times	Hillary Clinton	475,942	October 6	St. Petersburg	Florida	Barack Obama	
Effingham Daily News	Hillary Clinton	9,564	October 6	Effingham	Illinois		(Note: The Effingham Daily News does not typically endorse candidates.)
Bangor Daily News	Hillary Clinton	52,382	October 7	Bangor	Maine	Barack Obama	
Hartford Courant	Hillary Clinton	178,515	October 7	Hartford	Connecticut	Barack Obama	
The Denver Post	Hillary Clinton	573,542	October 7	Denver	Colorado	Barack Obama	
The Seattle Times	Hillary Clinton	352,131	October 7	Seattle	Washington	Barack Obama	
Ventura County Star	Hillary Clinton	56,006	October 7	Camarillo	California	Barack Obama	
The Cullman Times	Hillary Clinton	11,425	October 7	Cullman	Alabama		
The Daily Star	Hillary Clinton	10,548	October 7	Oneonta	New York		(Note: The Daily Star endorsed Obama in 2008.)
The Post-Standard	Hillary Clinton	111,664	October 7	Syracuse	New York	No endorsement	
Santa Barbara News-Press	Donald Trump	21,245	October 7	Santa Barbara	California	Mitt Romney	(Note: There is no published editorial explaining this endorsement.)
Bluefield Daily Telegraph	Hillary Clinton	13,343	October 8	Bluefield	West Virginia	Mitt Romney	
Lockport Union-Sun & Journal	Hillary Clinton	5,726	October 8	Lockport	New York		
Pharos-Tribune	Hillary Clinton	8,425	October 8	Logansport	Indiana		
St. Louis Post-Dispatch	Hillary Clinton	438,058	October 8	St. Louis	Missouri	Barack Obama	
New Castle News	Hillary Clinton	12,631	October 8	New Castle	Pennsylvania	No endorsement	
The Meadville Tribune	Hillary Clinton	9,792	October 8	Meadville	Pennsylvania		
Herald-Banner	Hillary Clinton	4,880	October 8	Greenville	Texas		(Note: The same editorial that appeared in the Herald-Banner appeared in the separate sister weekly publication Rockwall County Herald-Banner on October 14.)
The Boston Globe	Hillary Clinton	377,405	October 8	Boston	Massachusetts	Barack Obama	
The Daily Citizen	Hillary Clinton	11,000	October 8	Dalton	Georgia		
The Commercial Appeal	Hillary Clinton	110,453	October 8	Memphis	Tennessee	No endorsement	(Note: The Commercial Appeal endorsed Republicans from 1980 through 2000, and Democrats in 2004 and 2008.)
The Daily Independent	Hillary Clinton	12,088	October 8	Ashland	Kentucky		(Note: The Daily Independent endorsed McCain in 2008)
Clinton Herald	Hillary Clinton	7,950	October 8	Clinton	Iowa		
The Fresno Bee	Hillary Clinton	108,116	October 8	Fresno	California	Barack Obama	
Deseret News	Not Donald Trump	102,194	October 8	Salt Lake City	Utah	No endorsement	(Note: The News – owned by the LDS Church – has not endorsed a candidate in 80 years, but wrote that Donald Trump should drop out of the race.)
Enid News & Eagle	Hillary Clinton	11,693	October 8	Enid	Oklahoma		(Note: The Enid News & Eagle is traditionally a conservative paper.)
The Olympian	Hillary Clinton	21,325	October 8	Olympia	Washington	Barack Obama	
The News Virginian	Hillary Clinton	5,298	October 8	Waynesboro	Virginia		
The News & Observer	Hillary Clinton	147,218	October 8	Raleigh	North Carolina	Barack Obama	
Muskogee Phoenix	Hillary Clinton	9,741	October 8	Muskogee	Oklahoma		(Note: The same editorial that was published in the Muskogee Phoenix was also published on October 12 in its sister publication, the Tahlequah Daily Press.)
Times-Standard	Hillary Clinton	21,623	October 8	Eureka	California		
Niagara Gazette	Hillary Clinton	10,008	October 9	Niagara Falls	New York		(Note: The Niagara Gazette endorsed Obama in 2008.)
Kokomo Tribune	Hillary Clinton	18,029	October 9	Kokomo	Indiana		
The Free Press	Hillary Clinton	16,874	October 9	Mankato	Minnesota		(Note: The Free Press endorsed McCain in 2008.)
The Tribune-Democrat	Hillary Clinton	28,720	October 9	Johnstown	Pennsylvania	Mitt Romney	
The Plain Dealer	Hillary Clinton	397,891	October 9	Cleveland	Ohio	Barack Obama	(Note: Since 1936, the Plain Dealer has endorsed 14 Republicans and 5 Democrats for president.)
Las Vegas Sun	Hillary Clinton	203,736	October 9	Las Vegas	Nevada	Barack Obama	(Note: The Las Vegas Sun is published as a supplement to the Review-Journal.)
The Columbus Dispatch	Hillary Clinton	221,547	October 9	Columbus	Ohio	Mitt Romney	(Note: The last time the Dispatch had endorsed a Democrat for president was 1916.)
The Day	Hillary Clinton	24,657	October 9	New London	Connecticut	Barack Obama	
The Hawk Eye	Hillary Clinton	15,399	October 9	Burlington	Iowa	Barack Obama	
The Northwest Arkansas Democrat Gazette	No endorsement	17,807	October 9	Fayetteville	Arkansas		(Note: The Democrat Gazette, traditionally a Republican paper, published dual non-endorsements of Clinton and Trump.)
Arkansas Democrat-Gazette	No endorsement	179,134	October 9	Little Rock	Arkansas	Mitt Romney	(Note: The Democrat-Gazette, traditionally a Republican paper, published dual non-endorsements of Clinton and Trump. These same editorials also appeared in its sister publication, the Northwest Arkansas Democrat-Gazette.)
McAlester News-Capital	Hillary Clinton	9,000	October 9	McAlester	Oklahoma		
Commercial-News	Hillary Clinton	11,100	October 9	Danville	Illinois		
The Sun News	Hillary Clinton	38,133	October 9	Myrtle Beach	South Carolina	Barack Obama	
The Daily News of Newburyport	Hillary Clinton	8,052	October 9	Newburyport	Massachusetts		(Note: An identically worded editorial appeared in four other newspapers that are part of Community Newspaper Holdings in Massachusetts.)
The Birmingham News	Hillary Clinton	104,316	October 9	Birmingham	Alabama	No endorsement	(Note: Except for 2012, the News had endorsed every Republican candidate since 1980. An identically-worded endorsement was also published in its sister publications The Press-Register of Mobile and The Huntsville Times.)
Press-Register	Hillary Clinton	86,276	October 9	Mobile	Alabama	No endorsement	
The Huntsville Times	Hillary Clinton	45,471	October 9	Huntsville	Alabama	No endorsement	
The Eagle-Tribune	Hillary Clinton	28,055	October 9	North Andover	Massachusetts	Mitt Romney	
The Record	Hillary Clinton	30,617	October 9	Stockton	California	Barack Obama	
The Valdosta Daily Times	Hillary Clinton	13,223	October 9	Valdosta	Georgia		
Press-Republican	Hillary Clinton	15,268	October 9	Plattsburgh	New York	No endorsement	(Note: The last time the Press-Republican endorsed a presidential candidate was more than 40 years ago.)
Cumberland Times-News	Hillary Clinton	21,067	October 9	Cumberland	Maryland		
Grand Junction Daily Sentinel	Not Donald Trump	24,326	October 9	Grand Junction	Colorado	Mitt Romney	(Note: The Daily Sentinel, traditionally a Republican newspaper, said Donald Trump should step aside.)
Courier News	Hillary Clinton	11,943	October 9	Somerville	New Jersey		(Note: The Courier News published their endorsement a week earlier than originally planned, also urging Trump to step aside. An identically-worded endorsement was also published in its sister publications The Asbury Park Press and The Daily Record.)
Marin Independent Journal	Hillary Clinton	27,203	October 9	San Rafael	California	Barack Obama	
Gloucester Daily Times	Hillary Clinton	6,137	October 9	Gloucester	Massachusetts		
The Salem News	Hillary Clinton	15,624	October 9	Salem	Massachusetts		
Asbury Park Press	Hillary Clinton	109,060	October 9	Asbury Park	New Jersey	Barack Obama	
Daily Record	Hillary Clinton	14,952	October 9	Morristown	New Jersey		
The Woodward News	Hillary Clinton	3,414	October 9	Woodward	Oklahoma		(Note: The Woodward News published the endorsement editorial from its sister publication, the Enid Eagle, and then added at the end that they embraced this message.)
The Register-Herald	Hillary Clinton	17,754	October 9	Beckley	West Virginia		
The Huntsville Item	Hillary Clinton	4,288	October 9	Huntsville	Texas		(Note: The Item republished the editorial from The Cullman Times endorsing Clinton.)
News and Tribune	Hillary Clinton	6,052	October 9	Jeffersonville	Indiana		(Note: The October 9 editorial is identical to the one that appeared in its sister publication, the Kokomo Times. But the News and Tribune published a separate, original endorsement (with the paper's editors named in the byline) on October 11, titled "Hillary Clinton Best Choice For President".)
Greensburg Daily News	Hillary Clinton	3,592	October 9	Greensburg	Indiana		(Note: The exact same editorial appeared in its sister publication, the Kokomo Tribune.)
The Daily Item	Hillary Clinton	20,639	October 9	Sunbury	Pennsylvania	Barack Obama	
The Norman Transcript	Hillary Clinton	9,249	October 9	Norman	Oklahoma		
Times West Virginian	Hillary Clinton	7,987	October 9	Fairmont	West Virginia		
Naples Daily News	No endorsement	45,831	October 9	Naples	Florida	Mitt Romney	
Tribune-Star	Hillary Clinton	18,502	October 10	Terre Haute	Indiana		
The Joplin Globe	Hillary Clinton	22,684	October 10	Joplin	Missouri	Mitt Romney	
The Record	Hillary Clinton	175,452	October 10	Hackensack	New Jersey	Barack Obama	
Bristol Herald Courier	No endorsement	26,166	October 10	Bristol	Virginia		(Note: The Bristol Herald Courier endorsed McCain in 2008 and Bush in 2004.)
The Times Record	Hillary Clinton	9,600	October 10	Brunswick	Maine		
Santa Cruz Sentinel	Hillary Clinton	24,000	October 11	Scotts Valley	California	Barack Obama	
The Goshen News	Hillary Clinton	8,440	October 11	Goshen	Indiana		(Note: This same editorial appeared in the edition of October 11 of the paper's sister publication, the Jeffersonville News and Tribune.)
York Daily Record	Not Donald Trump	71,315	October 11	York	Pennsylvania	Barack Obama	(Note: While they all agreed not to vote for Trump, the editorial board of the Daily Record could not reach a consensus in favor of Clinton.)
The Bernardsville News	Hillary Clinton	4,891	October 11	Bernardsville	New Jersey	Barack Obama	
Telegraph Herald	Not Donald Trump	34,015	October 11	Dubuque	Iowa	No endorsement	(Note: The Telegraph Herald's editorial notes that for decades they have not endorsed a candidate for president, but this time it was important to write an editorial against a candidate.)
Mineral Wells Index	Hillary Clinton	2,370	October 12	Mineral Wells	Texas		(Note: The Mineral Wells Index's editorial notes that this editorial originally appeared in a sister publication, The Cullman Times, and it endorses this editorial.)
Ada Evening News	Hillary Clinton	7,871	October 12	Ada	Oklahoma		
The Salt Lake Tribune	Hillary Clinton	148,079	October 12	Salt Lake City	Utah	Barack Obama	
The Burlington Free Press	Hillary Clinton	25,848	October 12	Burlington	Vermont	Barack Obama	
Traverse City Record-Eagle	Hillary Clinton	23,406	October 12	Traverse City	Michigan		
Courier-Post	Hillary Clinton	43,096	October 12	Cherry Hill	New Jersey		(Note: An identically-worded endorsement was also published in the Courier-Post's sister publication, The Daily Journal.)
The Daily Journal	Hillary Clinton	9,983	October 12	Vineland	New Jersey		
Tahlequah Daily Press	Hillary Clinton	3,189	October 12	Tahlequah	Oklahoma		
Glasgow Daily Times	Hillary Clinton	6,268	October 12	Glasgow	Kentucky		(Note: "This editorial originated through CNHI News and The Ashland Daily Independent, and we embrace its message.")
The San Francisco Examiner	Hillary Clinton	254,237	October 13	San Francisco	California	Barack Obama	
The Washington Post	Hillary Clinton	573,348	October 13	Washington	District of Columbia	Barack Obama	(Note: Before endorsing Clinton The Post published an editorial specifically saying that it would not endorse Donald Trump.)
Daily Review Atlas	No endorsement	1,419	October 13	Monmouth	Illinois	No endorsement	
Idaho Statesman	Hillary Clinton	53,784	October 13	Boise	Idaho	No endorsement	(Note: The Idaho Statesman endorsed Obama in 2008.)
The Meridian Star	Hillary Clinton	9,750	October 13	Meridian	Mississippi		
Charleston Gazette-Mail	Hillary Clinton	54,832	October 14	Charleston	West Virginia	Split endorsement	(Note: Charleston's two daily newspapers, the Gazette and Daily Mail merged operations in 2015, but maintain individual editorial departments. The Gazette endorsed Clinton on October 14. The Daily Mail originally withheld their endorsement, but changed their mind and published an editorial on November 4 urging voters to write in McMullin. In 2012 when they were separate newspapers, the Gazette endorsed Obama, and the Daily Mail endorsed Romney.)
Charleston Gazette-Mail	Evan McMullin	54,832	November 5	Charleston	West Virginia	Split endorsement	(Note: Charleston's two daily newspapers, the Gazette and Daily Mail merged operations in 2015, but maintain individual editorial departments. The Gazette endorsed Clinton on October 14. The Daily Mail originally withheld their endorsement, but changed their mind and published an editorial on November 4 urging voters to write in McMullin. In 2012 when they were separate newspapers, the Gazette endorsed Obama, and the Daily Mail endorsed Romney.)
The Jersey Journal	Hillary Clinton	13,687	October 14	Secaucus	New Jersey	Barack Obama	(Note: The 2012 endorsement was published by its sister paper, The Star Ledger.)
News-Press	Hillary Clinton	5,876	October 14	Stillwater	Oklahoma		
Miami Herald	Hillary Clinton	165,695	October 14	Miami	Florida	Barack Obama	
Democrat and Chronicle	Hillary Clinton	131,456	October 14	Rochester	New York	Barack Obama	
The Daily Astorian	Hillary Clinton	6,307	October 14	Astoria	Oregon	Barack Obama	
The Kansas City Star	Hillary Clinton	226,869	October 14	Kansas City	Missouri	Barack Obama	
Orlando Sentinel	Hillary Clinton	221,613	October 14	Orlando	Florida	Mitt Romney	
The Oregonian	No endorsement	209,944	October 14	Portland	Oregon	No endorsement	(Note: In 2012, The Oregonian editorial board chose to end their practice of endorsing candidates for President in favor of more attention to local endorsements.)
Duncan Banner	Hillary Clinton	7,875	October 14	Duncan	Oklahoma		
Lexington Herald-Leader	Hillary Clinton	87,769	October 14	Lexington	Kentucky	Barack Obama	
The Express-Star	Hillary Clinton	4,670	October 14	Chickasha	Oklahoma		(Note: An identically worded editorial to the Express-Star's appeared in the Duncan Banner.)
The York Dispatch	Hillary Clinton	37,000	October 14	York	Pennsylvania		
El Nuevo Herald	Hillary Clinton	59,617	October 14	Miami	Florida		(Note: El Nuevo Herald is considered a conservative, Republican paper like its sister paper The Miami Herald.)
The Times-Picayune	Hillary Clinton	116,161	October 15	New Orleans	Louisiana	No endorsement	
Mt. Vernon Register-News	Hillary Clinton	5,499	October 15	Mt. Vernon	Illinois		
The Providence Journal	Hillary Clinton	94,822	October 15	Providence	Rhode Island	Barack Obama	
The Des Moines Register	Hillary Clinton	174,208	October 15	Des Moines	Iowa	Mitt Romney	
Reporter-Herald	Hillary Clinton	16,892	October 15	Loveland	Colorado	Mitt Romney	(Note: The editorial noted that up until this point they endorsed Republican candidates for president "throughout its modern history." An identically-worded endorsement was also published in the Reporter-Herald's sister publication The Longmont Times-Call.)
Peoria Journal Star	Hillary Clinton	57,165	October 15	Peoria	Illinois	Mitt Romney	
Omaha World-Herald	Hillary Clinton	141,530	October 15	Omaha	Nebraska	Mitt Romney	(Note: This was the World-Herald's first endorsement of a Democrat for president since 1932.)
Roswell Daily Record	No endorsement	10,013	October 15	Roswell	New Mexico		(Note: The Roswell Daily Record endorsed McCain in 2008.)
The Santa Fe New Mexican	Hillary Clinton	18,337	October 15	Santa Fe	New Mexico	Barack Obama	
The Herald Bulletin	Hillary Clinton	16,930	October 15	Anderson	Indiana	Barack Obama	
Midland Daily News	Hillary Clinton	11,764	October 15	Midland	Michigan	Mitt Romney	
Longmont Times-Call	Hillary Clinton	12,905	October 15	Longmont	Colorado	Mitt Romney	(Note: The editorial noted that up until this point the Longmont Times-Call had endorsed Republican candidates for president "throughout its modern history." An identically-worded endorsement was also published in its sister publication The Loveland Reporter-Herald.)
The Modesto Bee	Hillary Clinton	59,555	October 15	Modesto	California	No endorsement	
Adirondack Daily Enterprise	Hillary Clinton	3,600	October 15	Saranac Lake	New York		
Concord Monitor	Hillary Clinton	22,747	October 16	Concord	New Hampshire	Barack Obama	(Note: The Concord Monitor's editorial board published a separate article urging voters not to vote for Donald Trump.)
The Bulletin	Hillary Clinton	25,531	October 16	Bend	Oregon	Mitt Romney	
Foster's Daily Democrat	Hillary Clinton	16,235	October 16	Dover	New Hampshire	Mitt Romney	(Note: An identical editorial to the Foster's Daily Democrat appeared in other Local Media Group papers, including The Portsmouth Herald.)
The Courier-Journal	Hillary Clinton	202,164	October 16	Louisville	Kentucky	Barack Obama	
Wisconsin State Journal	Hillary Clinton	91,043	October 16	Madison	Wisconsin	Mitt Romney	
The News Leader	Hillary Clinton	15,605	October 16	Staunton	Virginia	Barack Obama	
The Columbian	Hillary Clinton	31,496	October 16	Vancouver	Washington	Mitt Romney	
The Pantagraph	Hillary Clinton	32,762	October 16	Bloomington-Normal	Illinois	Mitt Romney	(Note: The same editorial appeared in the Pantagraph's sister publication, Herald & Review.)
Herald & Review	Hillary Clinton	37,536	October 16	Decatur	Illinois	Mitt Romney	
The Keene Sentinel	Hillary Clinton	9,602	October 16	Keene	New Hampshire	Barack Obama	
Staten Island Advance	Hillary Clinton	36,783	October 16	Staten Island	New York	Barack Obama	
The Oklahoman	No endorsement	151,987	October 16	Oklahoma City	Oklahoma	Mitt Romney	
The Post-Star	Hillary Clinton	26,257	October 16	Glens Falls	New York	Barack Obama	
The Register-Guard	Hillary Clinton	49,740	October 16	Eugene	Oregon	Barack Obama	
Kenosha News	Hillary Clinton	22,353	October 16	Kenosha	Wisconsin		
Billings Gazette	Hillary Clinton	34,828	October 16	Billings	Montana	Mitt Romney	
Chattanooga Times Free Press	Split endorsement	73,525	October 16	Chattanooga	Tennessee	Split endorsement	(Note: The Chattanooga Times Free Press maintains separate editorial pages for its Times and Free Press components since the Times and Free Press merged in 1999. The Times endorsed Clinton, and the Free Press did not endorse a candidate. In 2012, the Times endorsed Obama, while the Free Press endorsed Johnson.)
St. Joseph News-Press	Donald Trump	24,681	October 16	St. Joseph	Missouri	Mitt Romney	(Note: The St. Joseph News-Press's endorsement was the first editorial (but not the first endorsement) supporting Trump in the general election.)
Northwest Herald	No endorsement	38,000	October 16	Crystal Lake	Illinois	Mitt Romney	
The Pueblo Chieftain	No endorsement	35,393	October 16	Pueblo	Colorado	Mitt Romney	
Star Beacon	Hillary Clinton	12,241	October 16	Ashtabula	Ohio		
The Press of Atlantic City	No endorsement	63,824	October 16	Atlantic City	New Jersey		
The Herald	Hillary Clinton	14,855	October 16	Sharon	Pennsylvania	No endorsement	
Canon City Daily Record	Hillary Clinton	3,433	October 16	Canon City	Colorado	Mitt Romney	(Note: The editorial noted that up until this point they endorsed Republican candidates for president "throughout its modern history." An identically-worded endorsement was also published in the Daily Record's sister publication The Longmont Times-Call.)
Merced Sun-Star	Hillary Clinton	13,261	October 17	Merced	California		
Waxahachie Daily Light	Donald Trump	3,191	October 17	Waxahachie	Texas		
LNP	Hillary Clinton	80,220	October 18	Lancaster	Pennsylvania	Split endorsement	(Note: LNP, then known as Intelligencer Journal/Lancaster New Era, had two separate editorial boards, which endorsed both Obama (Intelligencer Journal) and Romney (New Era), respectively, in editorials published on November 2, 2012.)
La Opinión	Hillary Clinton	49,953	October 18	Los Angeles	California	Barack Obama	
Walla Walla Union-Bulletin	Hillary Clinton	11,290	October 18	Walla Walla	Washington	Mitt Romney	
Chico Enterprise-Record	No endorsement	29,843	October 19	Chico	California	Mitt Romney	(Note: The same editorial appeared in a Chico Enterprise-Record sister publication, the Oroville Mercury-Register.)
Oroville Mercury-Register	No endorsement	5,852	October 19	Oroville	California	Mitt Romney	
El Diario La Prensa	Hillary Clinton	29,339	October 19	New York City	New York		
Boston Herald	No endorsement	96,403	October 20	Boston	Massachusetts	Mitt Romney	(Note: This was the first time in decades the Herald did not make an endorsement for president.)
Fort Worth Star-Telegram	Not Donald Trump	184,988	October 21	Fort Worth	Texas	Mitt Romney	
The Philadelphia Inquirer	Hillary Clinton	497,142	October 21	Philadelphia	Pennsylvania	Barack Obama	
Newsday	Hillary Clinton	510,683	October 21	Melville	New York	Mitt Romney	
Poughkeepsie Journal	Hillary Clinton	26,984	October 21	Poughkeepsie	New York	Barack Obama	
San Jose Mercury News	Hillary Clinton	634,001	October 21	San Jose	California	Barack Obama	(Note: An identically-worded endorsement was also published in the Mercury News's sister publication The East Bay Times.)
East Oregonian	Hillary Clinton	7,000	October 21	Pendleton	Oregon	Barack Obama	
Dixon Telegraph and Sterling Daily Gazette	No endorsement	21,399	October 21	Sterling	Illinois	Mitt Romney	(Note: Editorial represents the opinion of Shaw Media, which covers communities in the Sauk Valley, including the Dixon Telegraph (circulation 8,969) and Sterling Daily Gazette (circulation 12,430).)
The Herald-Dispatch	No endorsement	35,552	October 21	Huntington	West Virginia	Mitt Romney	
The Sentinel	No endorsement	10,276	October 21	Carlisle	Pennsylvania		
The Times-Gazette	Donald Trump	4,300	October 21	Hillsboro	Ohio		
East Bay Times	Hillary Clinton	525,000	October 21	Walnut Creek	California	Barack Obama	(Note: In 2016, the Contra Costa Times, Oakland Tribune, The Daily Review and The Argus were all merged into one newspaper, the East Bay Times.)
Iowa City Press-Citizen	Hillary Clinton	9,939	October 22	Iowa City	Iowa	Barack Obama	
Daily Herald	Hillary Clinton	102,293	October 22	Arlington Heights	Illinois	Mitt Romney	
The News Tribune	Hillary Clinton	79,914	October 22	Tacoma	Washington	Barack Obama	
Star Tribune	Hillary Clinton	589,725	October 22	Minneapolis	Minnesota	Barack Obama	
Rockford Register Star	Hillary Clinton	41,549	October 22	Rockford	Illinois	Barack Obama	
The Sun	No endorsement	42,000	October 22	Lowell	Massachusetts	Mitt Romney	
The State Journal-Register	Hillary Clinton	40,328	October 22	Springfield	Illinois	No endorsement	
Las Vegas Review-Journal	Donald Trump	133,560	October 22	Las Vegas	Nevada	Mitt Romney	(Note: The Las Vegas Review-Journal is owned by Sheldon Adelson, a major contributor to Donald Trump's campaign.)
The Bulletin	Hillary Clinton	155,47	October 22	Norwich	Connecticut	Mitt Romney	
The Bradenton Herald	No endorsement	32,938	October 22	Bradenton	Florida	No endorsement	
Tiffin Advertiser-Tribune	Not Hillary Clinton	9,200	October 23	Tiffin	Ohio		
Lincoln Journal Star	Hillary Clinton	54,614	October 23	Lincoln	Nebraska	Barack Obama	
News & Record	Hillary Clinton	68,262	October 23	Greensboro	North Carolina		
Quad-City Times	Hillary Clinton	46,428	October 23	Davenport	Iowa	Mitt Romney	
The Decatur Daily	Hillary Clinton	24,807	October 23	Decatur	Alabama	Barack Obama	
Carroll County Times	No endorsement	27,171	October 23	Westminster	Maryland		
Cape Cod Times	Hillary Clinton	37,627	October 23	Hyannis	Massachusetts	Mitt Romney	
The Southern Illinoisan	Hillary Clinton	26,180	October 23	Carbondale	Illinois	Mitt Romney	
The Daily News	Hillary Clinton	24,331	October 23	Galveston	Texas	Mitt Romney	
The Scranton Times-Tribune	Hillary Clinton	49,221	October 23	Scranton	Pennsylvania	Barack Obama	
The Citizens' Voice	Hillary Clinton	25,681	October 23	Wilkes-Barre	Pennsylvania	Barack Obama	(Note: Editorial notes "The editorial boards of The Citizen's Voice, The Times-Tribune of Scranton and The Standard-Speaker in Hazleton, endorse Democrat Hillary Clinton". All three of these papers belong to the Times-Shamrock Communications group.)
The Waterloo-Cedar Falls Courier	No endorsement	37,090	October 23	Waterloo	Iowa	Mitt Romney	
The Star-Ledger	Hillary Clinton	247,025	October 23	Newark	New Jersey	Barack Obama	
Globe Gazette	Hillary Clinton	14,923	October 23	Mason City	Iowa		
The Beaumont Enterprise	Hillary Clinton	27,180	October 23	Beaumont	Texas	Mitt Romney	
West Central Tribune	No endorsement	10,723	October 23	Willmar	Minnesota	Mitt Romney	(Note: This newspaper is part of the Forum Communications Company, which owns several small community papers in MN/ND/SD/WI region. This is the first time in 50 years the newspaper group has not endorsed a Republican candidate for president.)
The Dickinson Press	No endorsement	5,758	October 23	Dickinson	North Dakota	Mitt Romney	
The Forum of Fargo-Moorhead	No endorsement	43,606	October 23	Fargo	North Dakota	Mitt Romney	
Grand Forks Herald	No endorsement	21,324	October 23	Grand Forks	North Dakota	Mitt Romney	
Sentinel & Enterprise	No endorsement	16,393	October 23	Fitchburg	Massachusetts	Mitt Romney	
Duluth News Tribune	No endorsement	31,534	October 23	Duluth	Minnesota	Mitt Romney	
The Gazette	Hillary Clinton	49,050	October 23	Cedar Rapids	Iowa	Mitt Romney	
Honolulu Star-Advertiser	Hillary Clinton	171,160	October 23	Honolulu	Hawaii	Barack Obama	
The Bryan-College Station Eagle	Hillary Clinton	25,918	October 23	Bryan	Texas	Mitt Romney	
The Gazette	No endorsement	65,112	October 23	Colorado Springs	Colorado	Mitt Romney	
The Tennessean	No endorsement	198,214	October 23	Nashville	Tennessee	Mitt Romney	(Note: This was the first time since 1836 The Tennessean did not endorse a candidate. They also cited the fact no candidates chose to be interviewed by their editorial board as a reason for their non-endorsement. Instead, they published an editorial titled "We Endorse the Legitimacy of the U.S. Electoral System," while letting six citizens state their cases for Clinton, Trump and Johnson. The Tennessean supported Democratic candidates for 150 years until 2012, when it supported Romney.)
The Times of Northwest Indiana	No endorsement	77,357	October 23	Munster	Indiana	Mitt Romney	(Note: The editor of the Times parent company wrote they would only endorse in races where they could meet and question the candidates.)
The Daily Press	Hillary Clinton	78,749	October 23	Newport News	Virginia	Mitt Romney	
Antelope Valley Press	Donald Trump	15,735	October 23	Palmdale	California	Mitt Romney	(Note: The Antelope Valley Press's endorsement was offered without an accompanying editorial explaining the reason for the endorsement.)
AM New York	Hillary Clinton	336,000	October 24	New York City	New York		(Note: A similarly-worded endorsement appeared in the AM New York's parent publication Newsday.)
Mitchell Daily Republic	No endorsement	9,516	October 24	Mitchell	South Dakota	Mitt Romney	
Jamestown Sun	No endorsement	4,716	October 24	Jamestown	North Dakota	Mitt Romney	
Daily Globe	No endorsement	6,041	October 24	Worthington	Minnesota	Mitt Romney	
The Bemidji Pioneer	No endorsement	6,102	October 24	Bemidji	Minnesota	Mitt Romney	
The Standard-Speaker	Hillary Clinton	14,816	October 25	Hazleton	Pennsylvania		
Centralia Chronicle	No endorsement	14,000	October 25	Centralia	Washington	No endorsement	
The Washington Times	Donald Trump	59,185	October 26	Washington, D.C.	District of Columbia	Mitt Romney	
The Tribune	Hillary Clinton	28,669	October 27	San Luis Obispo	California	No endorsement	(Note: This is the first endorsement for president by the San Luis Obispo Tribune in 20 years.)
Reno Gazette-Journal	Hillary Clinton	82,745	October 27	Reno	Nevada	Mitt Romney	
The Buffalo News	Hillary Clinton	196,737	October 27	Buffalo	New York	Barack Obama	
Hudson Star-Observer	No endorsement	7,335	October 27	Hudson	Wisconsin	Mitt Romney	
The Flint Journal	Hillary Clinton	52,415	October 27	Flint	Michigan	Barack Obama	(Note: The Flint Journal is published four times weekly. As a part of the MLive Media Group, it is a shared editorial for several newspapers.)
Kalamazoo Gazette	Hillary Clinton	41,648	October 27	Kalamazoo	Michigan	Barack Obama	(Note: As a part of the MLive Media Group, it is a shared editorial for several newspapers.)
Muskegon Chronicle	Hillary Clinton	27,093	October 27	Muskegon	Michigan	Barack Obama	
The Grand Rapids Press	Hillary Clinton	116,679	October 27	Grand Rapids	Michigan	Mitt Romney	
Jackson Citizen Patriot	Hillary Clinton	21,823	October 27	Jackson	Michigan	Mitt Romney	
New Braunfels Herald-Zeitung	Hillary Clinton	10,295	October 28	New Braunfels	Texas		
Philadelphia Daily News	Hillary Clinton	46,234	October 28	Philadelphia	Pennsylvania	Barack Obama	
The Recorder	Hillary Clinton	11,522	October 28	Greenfield	Massachusetts	Barack Obama	(Note: On October 10, an editorial appeared in The Recorder, along with the Daily Hampshire Gazette, urging voters not to vote for Trump. This was updated to a Clinton endorsement on October 28.)
Daily Hampshire Gazette	Hillary Clinton	14,975	October 28	Northampton	Massachusetts	Barack Obama	
The News-Sentinel	Donald Trump	80,879	October 28	Fort Wayne	Indiana	Mitt Romney	(Note: The News-Sentinel endorsement is written as a pro-Pence and pro-Republican Party platform editorial, and the argument presented is voting for Trump is the only acceptable alternative to Clinton.)
The Patriot Ledger	Hillary Clinton	34,830	October 29	Quincy	Massachusetts		(Note: This newspaper is owned by GateHouse Media, and the same editorial was published in several of their publications.)
Albany Times Union	Hillary Clinton	107,765	October 29	Albany	New York	Barack Obama	
The State	Hillary Clinton	67,804	October 29	Columbia	South Carolina	No endorsement	(Note: This is the first time The State has endorsed a Democratic presidential nominee since 1976.)
Farmington Daily Times	Hillary Clinton	11,103	October 29	Farmington	New Mexico		
Detroit Free Press	Hillary Clinton	355,000	October 30	Detroit	Michigan	Barack Obama	
The MetroWest Daily News	Hillary Clinton	16,801	October 30	Framingham	Massachusetts	Barack Obama	(Note: An identical editorial also appeared in several other Massachusetts newspapers owned by Gatehouse Media.)
The Milford Daily News	Hillary Clinton	5,150	October 30	Milford	Massachusetts	Barack Obama	
The Free Lance-Star	No endorsement	39,598	October 30	Fredericksburg	Virginia	Barack Obama	
The Dispatch / The Rock Island Argus	No endorsement	35,397	October 30	Moline	Illinois	Mitt Romney	(Note: The Dispatch and The Rock Island Argus are owned by the same company, the contents of the two papers are the same except for different front covers for their respective markets.)
Erie Times-News	Hillary Clinton	54,325	October 30	Erie	Pennsylvania	Barack Obama	
Taunton Daily Gazette	Hillary Clinton	5,888	October 30	Taunton	Massachusetts		
The Enterprise	Hillary Clinton	21,767	October 30	Brockton	Massachusetts		
Bucks County Courier Times	No endorsement	39,788	October 30	Levittown	Pennsylvania	Mitt Romney	(Note: According to the Bucks County Courier Times article, "we won't be endorsing in the presidential race.")
Stamford Advocate	Hillary Clinton	12,760	October 30	Stamford	Connecticut	Barack Obama	(Note: This editorial appeared in several Connecticut newspapers that are allied with the Hearst Media Group.)
Greenwich Time	Hillary Clinton	6,747	October 30	Old Greenwich	Connecticut	Barack Obama	
The News-Times	Hillary Clinton	18,931	October 30	Danbury	Connecticut	Barack Obama	
The Hour	Hillary Clinton	23,788	October 30	Norwalk	Connecticut		
Connecticut Post	Hillary Clinton	46,317	October 30	Bridgeport	Connecticut		
The Daily Gazette	Hillary Clinton	57,323	October 30	Schenectady	New York		
The Herald News	Hillary Clinton	13,060	October 30	Fall River	Massachusetts		
Tri-City Herald	Hillary Clinton	35,487	October 30	Kennewick	Washington	Mitt Romney	
Daily Reflector	Donald Trump	16,966	October 30	Greenville	North Carolina	Mitt Romney	
Sioux City Journal	No endorsement	29,164	October 30	Sioux City	Iowa	Mitt Romney	
Albuquerque Journal	No endorsement	96,346	October 30	Albuquerque	New Mexico	Mitt Romney	
The Lima News	No endorsement	26,088	October 30	Lima	Ohio	Mitt Romney	
The Republican	Hillary Clinton	87,053	October 30	Springfield	Massachusetts	Barack Obama	
Daily Herald	Evan McMullin	26,757	October 30	Provo	Utah		(Note: On October 13, the Daily Herald published an editorial urging voters not to vote for Trump, but updated their stance on October 30 with a pro-McMullin endorsement.)
The Gadsden Times	No endorsement	14,131	October 30	Gadsden	Alabama	No endorsement	
The Beaver County Times	Hillary Clinton	27,288	October 30	Beaver	Pennsylvania		
Baytown Sun	No endorsement	10,236	October 30	Baytown	Texas		
The Athens Messenger	Hillary Clinton	12,000	October 31	Athens	Ohio		
Aiken Standard	No endorsement	12,832	October 31	Aiken	South Carolina	No endorsement	
Ashland Daily Tidings	Hillary Clinton	3,800	October 31	Ashland	Oregon		
The Durango Herald	Hillary Clinton	21,000	November 1	Durango	Colorado	Barack Obama	
The Vindicator	Hillary Clinton	49,622	November 1	Youngstown	Ohio	Barack Obama	(Note: The Vindicator editorial concludes that Clinton is unethically fit to be president, but given the lesser of two evils, a Trump presidency would be inconceivable.)
The Anniston Star	Hillary Clinton	17,155	November 1	Anniston	Alabama	Barack Obama	
Mail Tribune	Hillary Clinton	20,208	November 1	Medford	Oregon	Barack Obama	(Note: The Mail Tribune was not planning on endorsing any candidates for president this election, but were compelled to support Clinton in order to prevent Trump from becoming president.)
Carroll Daily Times Herald	No endorsement	5,456	November 2	Carroll	Iowa	Barack Obama	
The Aspen Times	Hillary Clinton	6,500	November 2	Aspen	Colorado	Barack Obama	
Watertown Daily Times	Hillary Clinton	21,583	November 2	Watertown	New York	Mitt Romney	(Note: The Daily Times does not want Clinton to be president, but as the "less-worse choice" considers it the only possible option to prevent Trump from being elected.)
Daily Sun News	Gary Johnson	3,300	November 2	Sunnyside	Washington		
Barre Montpelier Times Argus	Hillary Clinton	6,915	November 3	Barre	Vermont		
New Haven Register	No endorsement	64,827	November 3	New Haven	Connecticut	Barack Obama	
The Herald	Hillary Clinton	62,520	November 3	Everett	Washington	Barack Obama	
The Monterey Herald	Hillary Clinton	20,150	November 3	Monterey	California	Barack Obama	
Milwaukee Journal Sentinel	Not Donald Trump	318,711	November 4	Milwaukee	Wisconsin	No endorsement	
The News Journal	Hillary Clinton	104,570	November 4	Wilmington	Delaware	Barack Obama	
Beloit Daily News	No endorsement	13,145	November 5	Beloit	Wisconsin	Mitt Romney	
The Citizen	Hillary Clinton	7,925	November 5	Auburn	New York	Barack Obama	
Observer-Reporter	Hillary Clinton	32,350	November 5	Washington	Pennsylvania	Mitt Romney	
Greeley Tribune	No endorsement	18,200	November 5	Greeley	Colorado		
Republican-American	Donald Trump	43,403	November 5	Waterbury	Connecticut	Mitt Romney	
Ledger-Enquirer	Hillary Clinton	31,864	November 5	Columbus	Georgia	No endorsement	
The Florida Times-Union	Donald Trump	100,644	November 5	Jacksonville	Florida	Mitt Romney	(Note: The endorsement is "a top-down directive from Morris [Communications]," the parent company of the Florida Times-Union.")
The Daily Leader	No endorsement	5,700	November 5	Brookhaven	Mississippi		
Peninsula Clarion	Donald Trump	7,000	November 5	Kenai	Alaska	Mitt Romney	(Note: This newspaper is owned by Morris Communications, which directed its papers to publish editorials favoring Donald Trump.)
Athens Banner-Herald	Donald Trump	14,631	November 5	Athens	Georgia		
The Wall Street Journal	No endorsement	2,378,827	November 6	New York City	New York	No endorsement	(Note: The Wall Street Journal has not endorsed a candidate for President since 1928. Two editorials were published, summarizing their views on Trump and Clinton.)
Janesville Gazette	No endorsement	20,000	November 6	Janesville	Wisconsin	Mitt Romney	
The Ledger	No endorsement	50,180	November 6	Lakeland	Florida	No endorsement	(Note: The Ledger announced they were discontinuing endorsing candidates in 2012.)
The Exponent-Telegram	No endorsement	16,892	November 6	Clarksburg	West Virginia	Mitt Romney	
The Sun Chronicle	Not Donald Trump	25,372	November 6	Attleboro	Massachusetts		
Savannah Morning News	Donald Trump	35,043	November 6	Savannah	Georgia	Mitt Romney	
Topeka Capital-Journal	Donald Trump	29,168	November 6	Topeka	Kansas		
St. Augustine Record	Donald Trump	15,131	November 6	St. Augustine	Florida		
The Standard Times	Hillary Clinton	19,972	November 6	New Bedford	Massachusetts	Barack Obama	
Juneau Empire	Donald Trump	7,500	November 6	Juneau	Alaska		
The Augusta Chronicle	Donald Trump	47,456	November 6	Augusta	Georgia	Mitt Romney	
Lubbock Avalanche-Journal	Donald Trump	29,685	November 6	Lubbock	Texas	Mitt Romney	
Battle Creek Enquirer	Hillary Clinton	14,789	November 6	Battle Creek	Michigan		
The Post and Courier	Gary Johnson	74,027	November 6	Charleston	South Carolina	Mitt Romney	
Valley News	Hillary Clinton	16,605	November 6	West Lebanon	New Hampshire	Barack Obama	
Danville Register & Bee	Gary Johnson	15,873	November 6	Danville	Virginia	Mitt Romney	
Bowling Green Daily News	Donald Trump	21,709	November 6	Bowling Green	Kentucky	Mitt Romney	
Orange County Register	No endorsement	270,742	November 6	Santa Ana	California	No endorsement	(Note: The editorial was issued by the Southern California News Group, to which the Orange County Register editorial staff was merged into in 2016.)
The Times-Reporter	No endorsement	18,132	November 6	New Philadelphia	Ohio	No endorsement	
Finger Lakes Times	Hillary Clinton	10,064	November 6	Geneva	New York		
The Trentonian	Hillary Clinton	23,580	November 6	Trenton	New Jersey	No endorsement	
Pittsburgh Post-Gazette	No endorsement	318,962	November 6	Pittsburgh	Pennsylvania	Barack Obama	
The Daily Nonpareil	Not Donald Trump	11,709	November 6	Council Bluffs	Iowa		
The Patriot-News	Hillary Clinton	176,564	October 6	Harrisburg	Pennsylvania	Barack Obama	

== See also ==
- Newspaper endorsements in the United States presidential primaries, 2016
