= George H. W. Bush 1992 presidential campaign =

American political campaign

George H. W. Bush for President 1992
- Bush–Quayle campaign logo
- Campaign: 1992 Republican primaries 1992 U.S. presidential election
- Candidate: George H. W. Bush; 41st President of the United States (1989–1993); Dan Quayle; 44th Vice President of the United States (1989–1993)
- Affiliation: Republican Party
- Status: Announced: October 11, 1991; Presumptive nominee: May 5, 1992; Official nominee: August 20, 1992; Lost election: November 3, 1992; Left office: January 20, 1993
- Headquarters: Houston, Texas
- Key people: James Baker (campaign manager); Fred Malek (campaign manager); Robert Mosbacher (fundraiser); Robert Teeter (pollster)
- Receipts: US$101,936,902
- Slogan(s): Don't Change the Team in the Middle of the Stream; Stand by the President; A Proud country

The 1992 presidential campaign of George H. W. Bush was an unsuccessful re-election campaign for 1992 United States presidential election by incumbent president George H. W. Bush, who had taken office on January 20, 1989. Bush and incumbent vice president Dan Quayle were defeated by Democratic presidential nominee Bill Clinton and vice presidential nominee Al Gore. Bush, a Republican president and former vice president under Ronald Reagan, launched his presidential bid on October 11, 1991, and secured nomination for his re-election on August 20, 1992. He was challenged in the Republican primaries by former White House Communications Director Pat Buchanan, who received less than one percent of the delegates in the Republican National Convention.

Bush launched his successful campaign in 1988, becoming the 41st president in January 1989. With a coalition victory in the Persian Gulf War and high approval ratings, Bush's re-election initially looked likely; however, he was criticized by many conservatives for breaking his pledge of never raising taxes. He felt the economy would be the deciding factor in the election and could even overshadow the success of Operation Desert Storm. Early counting of ballots in the New Hampshire primary favored Buchanan, but the final results gave a victory to Bush. It was a strong showing by Buchanan, as his score nearly matched Eugene McCarthy's protest vote against Lyndon B. Johnson in 1968. During the convention, it was speculated that Bush might drop Quayle from the ticket due to his relatively low polling performance, but Bush was unwilling, asserting that removing his 1988 choice from the 1992 ticket would be an implicit admission that choosing Quayle had been a mistake.

Meanwhile, Democrats nominated Bill Clinton, the governor of Arkansas as their presidential nominee, with Al Gore, a senator from Tennessee, as his running mate. Texas billionaire Ross Perot ran as an independent candidate; at one point Perot had a clear lead over the major-party candidates in the polls. During the campaign, Bush emphasized his foreign policy success, but as the economy went into a recession, his popularity fell. He conducted a whistle stop tour on a train named Spirit of America and participated in a series of three presidential debates. Clinton won the election, taking 43 percent of the popular vote and 370 electoral votes, while Bush won 37.5 percent of the popular vote and 168 electoral votes. Perot won 19% of the popular vote, one of the highest totals for a third-party candidate in U.S. history, but no electoral votes. Bush left office with a 56% approval rating and 37% disapproval rating.

Had Bush been re-elected, he would have been the second U.S. president to be elected both offices of vice president and president twice, after Richard Nixon in 1972.

== Background ==
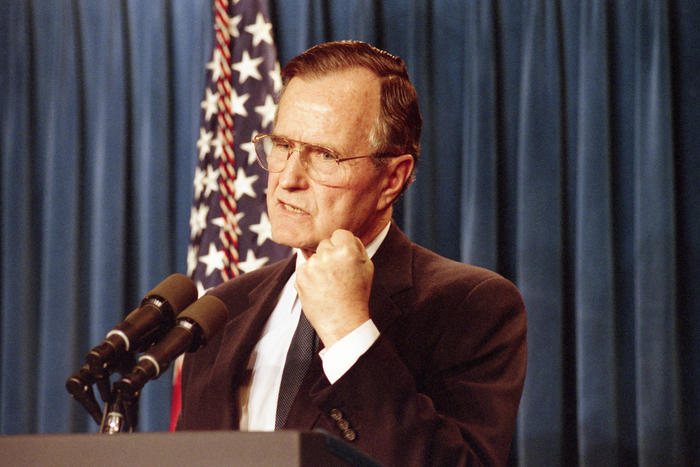
President George H. W. Bush in 1991

Bush was born in Milton, Massachusetts, in 1924. In 1964, he ran for the United States Senate from Texas and won the Republican nomination, but lost the election by 56% to 44%. He was elected to the U.S. House of Representatives from Texas's 7th congressional district in 1966. He served as ambassador to the United Nations under the Nixon Administration—his first major diplomatic experience with the Soviet Union and China. He ran in the 1980 Republican Party presidential primaries against Ronald Reagan, Bob Dole, and many other candidates. He won a close victory in the Iowa caucus with 31.5% to Reagan's 29.4%, but ended up losing many contests to Reagan, and dropped out of the race. Reagan chose Bush to run as the Republican nominee for vice president. Bush accepted the position and threw himself into campaigning for the Reagan-Bush ticket. They won the 1980 presidential election in a landslide victory against the incumbent President Jimmy Carter. As vice president, Bush maintained a low profile by avoiding decision-making and not criticizing the president publicly. Reagan won his re-election in 1984 in a landslide victory against Walter Mondale, winning 49 of 50 states with Bush re-elected as vice president.

In 1987, Bush announced his presidential campaign led by Reagan staffer Lee Atwater. Bob Dole, Jack Kemp, and Pat Robertson challenged him in the primaries. After he won South Carolina, and 16 of 17 states on Super Tuesday, his competitors dropped out of the race. Bush also pledged that he would not raise taxes, stating: "read my lips: no new taxes". Bush selected Senator Dan Quayle of Indiana as his running mate. They won the 1988 presidential election against Democratic nominee Michael Dukakis, and Bush became the first incumbent vice president to be elected president since Martin Van Buren in 1836. Bush was inaugurated on January 20, 1989, with an approval rating of 51%.

During his term, Bush signed various bilateral treaties between the United States and the Soviet Union, like START I and START II, on the limitation of strategic offensive arms and nuclear weapons. With the fall of Berlin Wall in late 1989, the Bush administration facilitated reunification of Germany on terms favorable to the United States and a democratic Germany. During the same time, the United States invaded Panama to depose Panamanian dictator Manuel Noriega. With Soviet regime's position weakening on all fronts, the Soviet Union dissolved in late 1991, thus ending the Cold War. Bush achieved an approval rating of 89% in March 1991, after the United States' and coalition victory in Persian Gulf.

However, as the economy went into a recession in 1990, the unemployment rate rose from 5.9% in 1989 to a high of 7.8% in mid-1991 and the debt percentage of total gross domestic product (GDP) rose from 39.4% in 1989 to almost 46.8% in 1992. As the recession continued, people became increasingly worried about the changing economic situation of the nation. In September 1990, Bush and congressional Democrats announced a compromise to cut funding for mandatory and discretionary programs while also raising revenue, partly through a higher gas tax. The compromise included a "pay as you go" provision that required that new programs be paid for at the time of implementation. Conservatives opposed the bill, strongly against any form of tax increase. Bush's decision to sign the bill damaged his standing with conservatives and the public as he broke his pledge to never to raise taxes.

== Gaining the nomination ==
=== Preparing for a run ===
In early 1991, Bush once considered not running for re-election, asserting he seemed not to have an "ounce of energy to manage a massive project". With the end of the Persian Gulf war in March 1991, Bush had very high approval ratings, some even approaching 90%. But by 1992, many conservative Republicans' support of Bush had waned for a variety of reasons, including raising taxes and cutting defense spending. Americans were less concerned with his foreign policy successes than the nation's changing economic situation. Bush was not impressed by the polls' prediction that he would win re-election. He felt the economy would be the deciding factor in the election and could even overshadow the success of Operation Desert Storm. While 71% of the population viewed Bush's handling of foreign policy positively, only 21% approved of his handling of domestic issues. Yet, while addressing a rally in Texas on February 12, 1992, he announced his re-election bid and said:

Let me tell you why I'm running. I came here to do important work, and I finish what I start. In 1980 I came to Washington as a part of a team. We started a revolution to free America from, you remember, the politics of malaise and to set sail toward America's destiny. Then in 1988, Dan Quayle and I began our own partnership built on the same principles. My message then and my message now is simple: I believe Government is too big, and it costs too much. I believe in a strong defense for this country and good schools, safe streets, a Government really worthy of the people. I believe that parents, not Government, should make the important decisions about health, child care, and education. I believe in personal responsibility. I believe in opportunity for all. We should throw open wide the doors of possibility to anyone who has been locked out.

After the success of the Gulf War, Bush's re-election was considered highly likely. Several high-profile Democratic Party candidates, like Mario Cuomo and Jesse Jackson, refused to seek the Democratic nomination. The media gave the Democratic Party little chance of winning the presidency. Most Republicans continued to endorse Bush as their nominee. Ron Paul, the Libertarian Party's presidential nominee in 1988, had planned to run against the president as a Republican, but dropped out shortly after former White House communication director Pat Buchanan's entry in the Republican primaries. In 1990, determined to undercut Bush, Buchanan published a newsletter called Patrick J. Buchanan: From the Right; it sent subscribers a bumper sticker reading: "Read Our Lips! No new taxes".

=== Vice-presidential selection ===
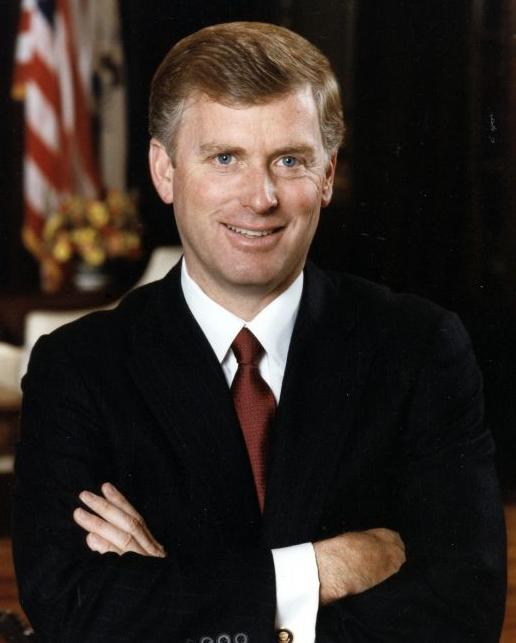
Vice President Dan Quayle

Throughout Bush's presidency, there existed widespread speculation about Bush potentially replacing Quayle as his running-mate in his expected 1992 reelection. As early as 1989, Quayle's poor public standing was noted by the Washington Post, which conducted a poll that found voters did not consider him fit to take over the presidency by a 52 to 38 percent margin. In 1990, The New York Times reported that there was a movement to have Quayle replaced on the Republican ticket in 1992. The choice of running mate was considered to be particularly important given Bush's age and widely reported health issues.

Despite Bush's misgivings with the Vice President, he was reluctant to drop Quayle in the absence of him voluntarily stepping aside. Bush asserted that removing his 1988 choice from the 1992 ticket would be an implicit admission that choosing Quayle had been a mistake. In the aftermath of criticism over raising taxes, Bush had no appetite for another controversial political moment. Nevertheless, there were reports that Bush did indeed consult with top confidantes about replacing Quayle on at least two occasions, including in a conversation with Chief of Staff James Baker.

The May 1991 issue of Time magazine features a cover story on the push to replace Quayle on the ticket. The names mentioned were:

- Dick Cheney, Secretary of Defense
- Colin Powell, Chairman of the Joint Chiefs of Staff
- Pete Wilson, Governor of California
- Nancy Kassebaum, Senator from Kansas
- Carroll Campbell, Governor of South Carolina

Bush's son George W. Bush urged him to replace Quayle with Cheney, and his son Jeb Bush also urged him to replace Quayle because of his relatively low polling performance. Former Presidents Richard Nixon and Gerald Ford also urged Quayle's removal from the Republican ticket.

=== Republican presidential primaries ===
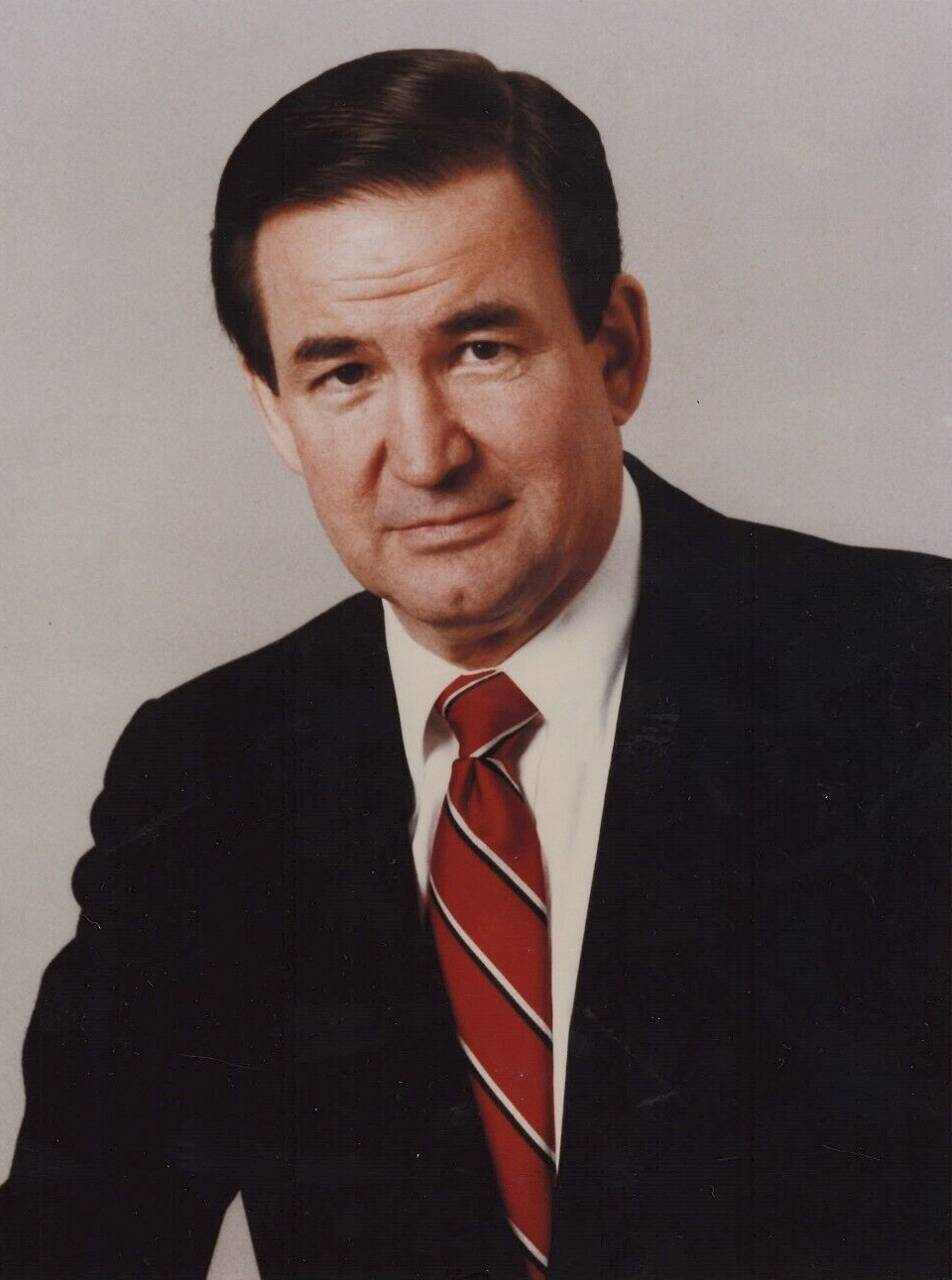
Pat Buchanan in 1985

Primaries were held for all 50 states and the District of Columbia from February 18 to June 9, 1992. In addition to Buchanan; David Duke, Pat Paulsen, Harold Stassen and Jack Fellure had also challenged Bush. Buchanan's candidacy relied heavily on a strong showing in the New Hampshire primary, as a result, Bush made New Hampshire a focal point in his re-election bid. However, New Hampshire remained a pivotal base for Buchanan's primary campaign. Buchanan explained the reason for running against incumbent President Bush:

If the country wants to go in a liberal direction, if the country wants to go in the direction of [Democrats] George Mitchell and Tom Foley, it doesn't bother me as long as I've made the best case I can. What I can't stand are the back-room deals. They're all in on it, the insider game, the establishment game—this is what we're running against.

Buchanan ran on a platform of immigration reduction and social conservatism, including opposition to multiculturalism, abortion, and gay rights. He also encouraged isolationism, causing Bush to stop talking about foreign policy almost entirely. Even after challenging an incumbent president in the primaries, his campaign managed to raise $14,521,899 (equivalent to $33,317,376 in 2025) from donations. On February 5, an exaggerated account suggesting Bush was unfamiliar with barcode readers made him look out of touch. Early counting of ballots in the New Hampshire primary favored Buchanan, but the final results gave a victory to Bush with 53% of the votes, followed by Buchanan with 38% of the vote. It was a strong showing by Buchanan as Bush got fewer votes than expected. Buchanan's score nearly matched Eugene McCarthy's protest vote against Lyndon B. Johnson in 1968.

Heading into primaries in Georgia and Texas, the campaign pollster Robert Teeter argued that Bush should criticize Buchanan's campaign directly, while Quayle disagreed. Bush said he would largely not criticize Buchanan directly, but "might tweak him from time to time". On the evening of the Georgia primary, in an interview to The Atlanta Constitution, Bush accepted that the tax increases in the 1990 budget deal had been his "biggest mistake". Buchanan managed to get 35% or more votes in primaries until March 10, after which, Bush won all the primaries on Super Tuesday which gave his campaign a lead in the polls. During a speech in May 1992 at the Commonwealth Club in San Francisco, Quayle discussed the high costs of the breakdown of the two-parent family and mentioned the sitcom television series Murphy Brown. He asserted that its plot-line was injurious to family values. He found the plot-line where a woman bore a child out of wedlock mocked the importance of fathers. Murphy Brown's co-creator Diane English responded, "If the vice president thinks it's disgraceful for an unmarried woman to bear children (out of wedlock), and if he believes that a woman cannot adequately raise a child without a father, then he'd better make sure abortion remains safe and legal." Quayle's comments backfired and were widely attacked for seeming to be insensitive to single mothers, but Quayle's criticism didn't affect the primary result and Bush went on to win all the remaining contests.

Bush won 72.84% of the popular vote while Buchanan won 22.96%. The fact that Buchanan got almost 2.9 million votes despite challenging an incumbent in primaries threatened Bush's campaign for his presidential run.

Bush's Secretary of Commerce Robert Mosbacher would chair this re-election campaign.

=== Republican National Convention ===
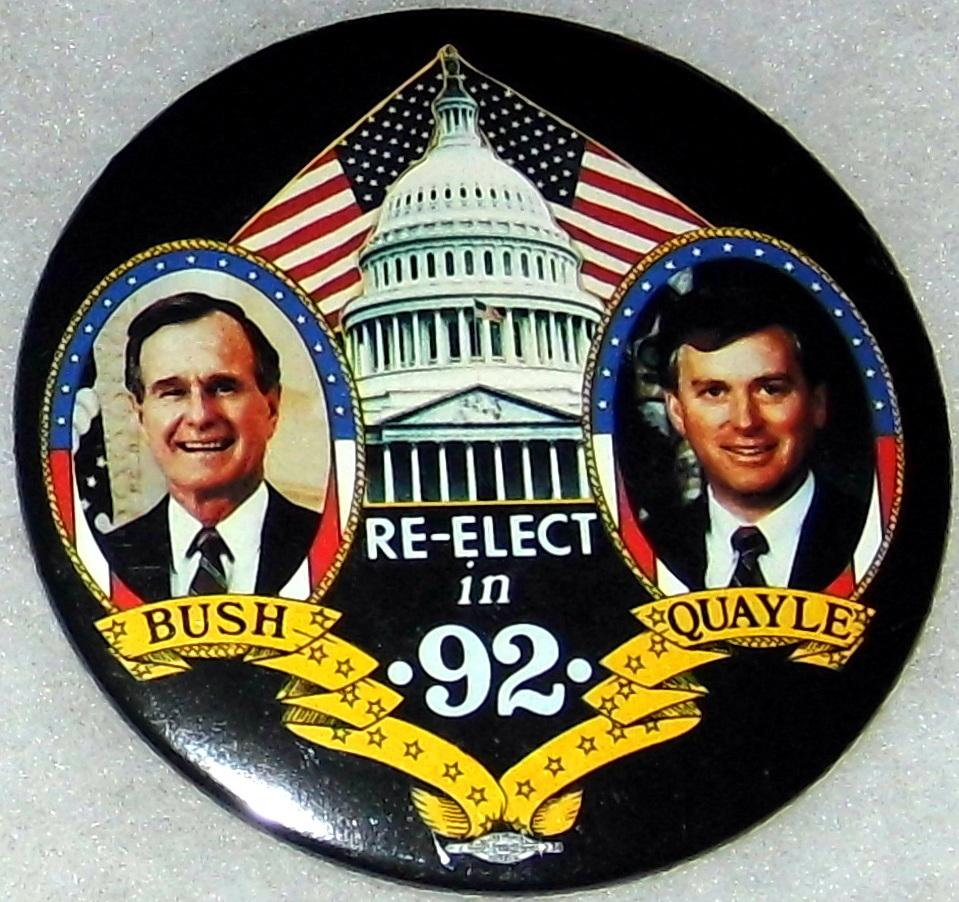
Bush's campaign button

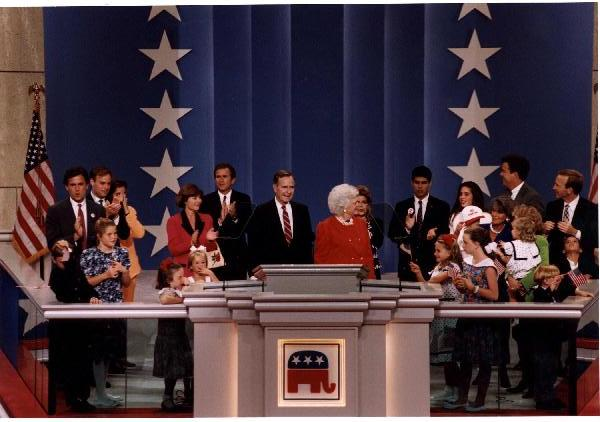
George H. W. Bush and Barbara Bush at the 1992 Republican National Convention.

In early August, the Bush campaign and the administration debated how Bush might take the initiative on the domestic front. The early ideas for the president's acceptance speech were issues that would have broad appeal. The 1992 Republican National Convention convened at the Astrodome in Houston, Texas, from August 17–20, 1992. To accommodate the convention and its setup, the Houston Astros, the Major League Baseball team that played at the Astrodome, played 26 consecutive away games over 28 days, while the National Football League's Houston Oilers played all their preseason games on the road. After the primaries, Buchanan endorsed Bush as the Republican nominee and was asked by the Bush campaign to deliver a keynote address at RNC, where his culture war speech alienated many moderates. With all the state contests settled in Bush's favor, the roll of delegates drawn up by the RNC heavily favored Bush as the unanimous choice, though Buchanan and Alan Keyes also won delegates. (Note: Although Alan Keyes did not run for president in Republican primaries, he got a vote from an unpledged delegate. He won the 1992 primary for the Senate seat from Maryland but lost the election.)

Heading to the convention, Robert Teeter said that the south was critical for Bush's re-election strategy, since both Bill Clinton and Al Gore were southerners. The 1992 convention was where former president Ronald Reagan made the last major address of his political career. Before the convention, Bill Clinton's poll numbers were rising, sharply affected by the fact he delivered his acceptance speech on the same night when Ross Perot dropped out of the race. Reagan said:

This fellow [Bill Clinton] they [Democrats] have nominated claims to be the new Thomas Jefferson, Let me tell you something, I knew Thomas Jefferson, he was a friend of mine, and Governor, you are no Thomas Jefferson. (Note: Reagan was humorously poking fun at his age and responding to Clinton's comparison to Thomas Jefferson by using the phrase "Senator, you're no Jack Kennedy" as "Governor, you're no Thomas Jefferson", which was used by Lloyd Bentsen in the 1988 Vice presidential debate.)

The convention energized the Republican base, giving the Bush-Quayle ticket a bounce in the polls. As the bounce faded, the race returned to a lopsided double-digit lead of the Democratic ticket. During his acceptance speech, President Bush thanked former president Richard Nixon for his advice and contributions to the administration's foreign policy. Bush opened his acceptance speech with issues related to foreign policy, taking credit for the multiple changes that had convulsed the world since the previous RNC convention four years before. He said:

My opponents say I spend too much time on foreign policy, as if it didn't matter that schoolchildren once hid under their desks in drills to prepare for nuclear war. I saw the chance to rid our children's dreams of the nuclear nightmare, and I did. Over the past 4 years, more people have breathed the fresh air of freedom than in all of human history. I saw a chance to help, and I did. These were the two defining opportunities not of a year, not of a decade, but of an entire span of human history. I seized those opportunities for our kids and our grandkids, and I make no apologies for that.

Bush received 2166 delegates; Buchanan received 18 delegates; and Alan Keyes received one delegate. Quayle was nominated as the vice-presidential candidate by voice vote.

== Opponents ==
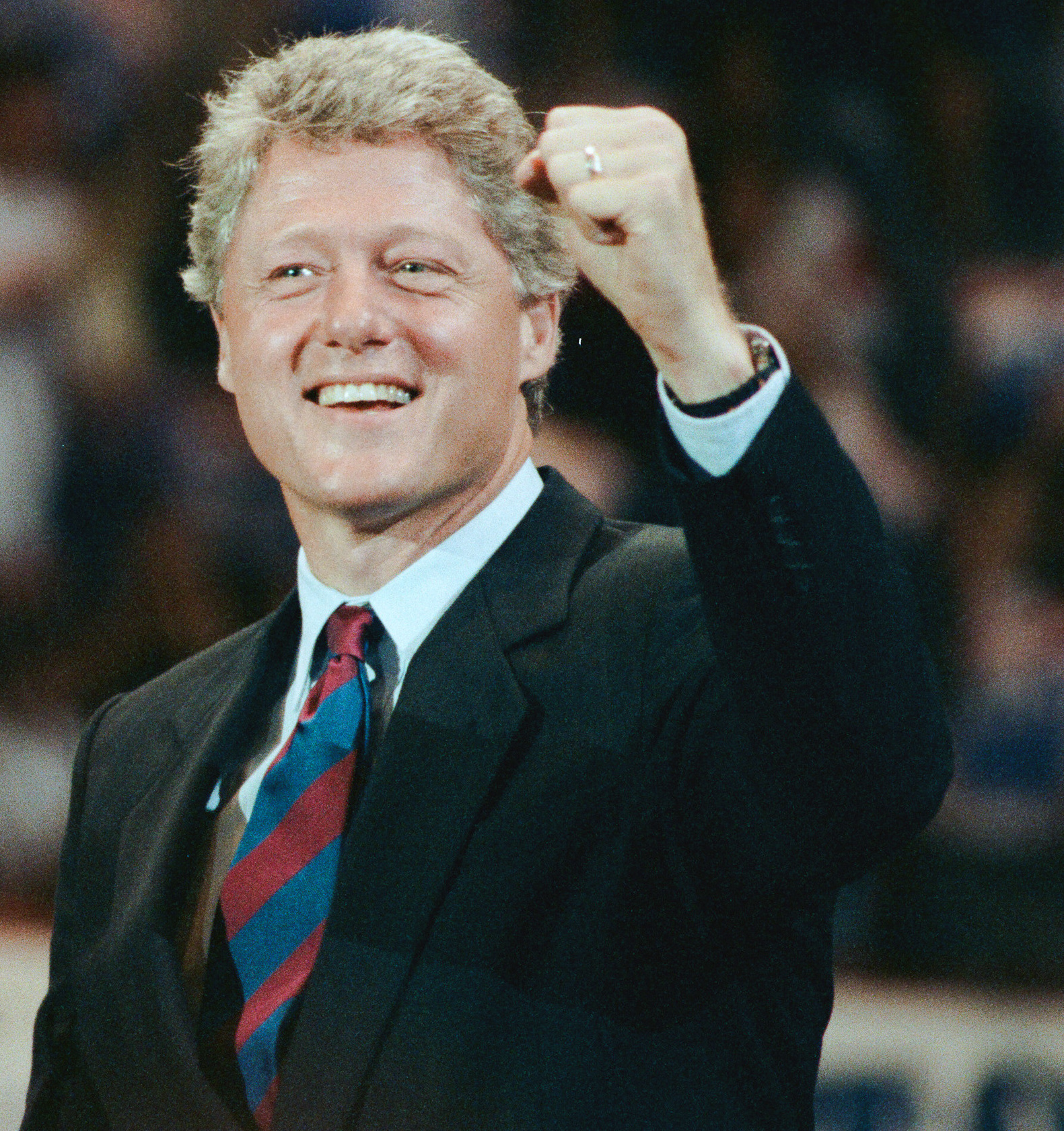
Bill Clinton at North Carolina State University in October 1992

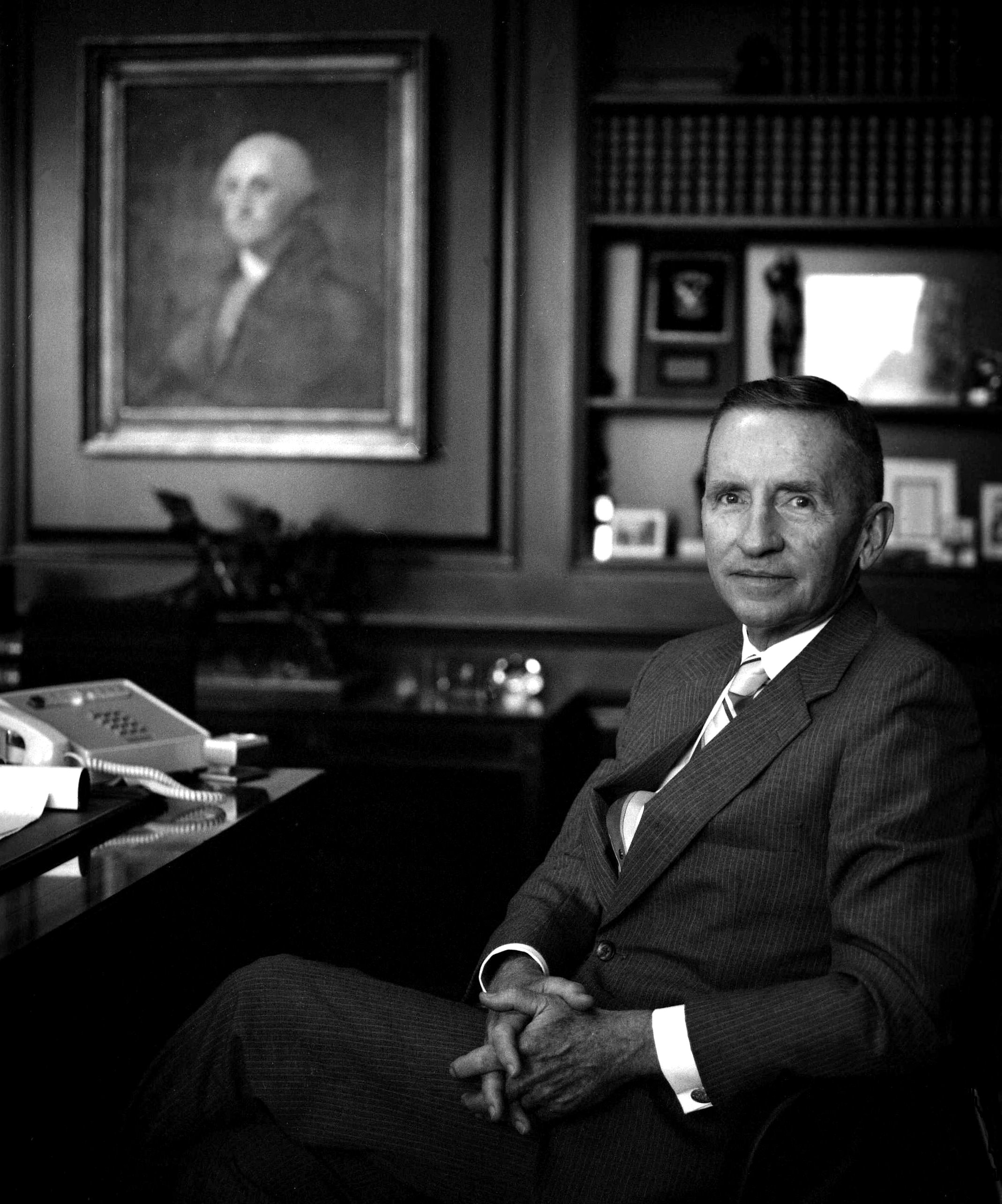
Ross Perot sitting next to a desk

The major candidates for Democratic nomination were Bill Clinton, Jerry Brown, and Paul Tsongas. Clinton was accused by Republicans and the Bush campaign of misleading the U.S. Army Reserve to avoid service in the Vietnam War. Though Brown was leading in the polls in September 1991, Clinton's lead eventually increased in February 1992, and he became the front runner. After coming in second place in New Hampshire, he delivered a speech labeling himself "The Comeback Kid", which re-energized his campaign. Clinton chose Al Gore, a senator from Tennessee as his running mate. Clinton appeared on The Arsenio Hall Show on June 3, 1992, the day after he secured the Democratic Party nomination, and played "Heartbreak Hotel" on the saxophone. This was considered an important moment in the campaign, as it helped him build popularity among young voters.

Texas businessman Ross Perot stated on Larry King Live on February 20, 1992, that he would begin a campaign if "ordinary people" signed petitions and helped him achieve ballot access in all 50 states. Following this, Tom Luce, a friend of Perot, organized draft movement throughout the nation with petition drives being coordinated. He chose retired Vice Admiral James Stockdale as his running mate. Throughout April, the draft efforts continued and Perot appeared on talk shows for discussing his plans and positions on political issues. He spend almost $61 million of his own money to finance the campaign. In June 1992, he was leading Bush and Clinton nationally with 39% of the vote. Speculation arose in the media that Perot would split the electoral college and force the United States House of Representatives to decide the presidency.

On July 16, Perot announced on Larry King Live he would not seek the presidency. He explained that he did not want the House of Representatives to decide the election if the result caused the electoral college to be split. He had also been deterred because of rumors that Bush campaign was planning on embarrassing his daughter by publicly releasing her doctored photographs and disrupting her wedding. He asked his supporters to look for other candidates to nominate for the race and formed United We Stand, a citizen action organization to "influence the debate" by . In August, he promised to endorse any candidate who accepted his economic plan; meanwhile, petitions for ballot access were approved in all 50 states. On October 1, Perot re-entered the presidential race, with a desire to further explain his economic plans.

== Campaign ==
=== August ===
On August 23, while addressing a rally at Lakeland, Florida, Quayle claimed that Bush planned to reduce taxes and spending to create new jobs. Quayle proposed an entitlement program which included medicare, medicaid and guaranteed loans. Bush campaigned extensively for the election. Just a week after the convention, he addressed a rally in Cincinnati, Ohio, where he criticized Clinton's health care plan and said it would lead to a new health care tax on those who can least afford it. He argued that even with Clinton as governor of Arkansas for 12 years, one in four lacked health insurance. He said the real price of the Clinton program was arguably at least three times higher than admitted, and referred to it as an "economic fantasy".

The Bush campaign denounced Clinton for avoiding military service in Vietnam. During speeches, Bush focused on his idea of letting parents, not government, choose their children's schools, whether public, private or religious. He raised issues about equivocation in statements made by Governor Clinton. According to the Center for Media and Public Affairs, 96% of evening news coverage throughout August focused on economic weakness and shortcomings. Political scientist Everett Carll Ladd later wrote "that the negative coverage distorted a complex picture with many positive as well as negative features", leading to reduce in Bush's polling numbers.

=== September ===
Opinion polling. Red denotes Bush, blue denotes Clinton, and green denotes Perot.

In early September, the feud between Quayle and Murphy Brown again gathered attention as the vice president responded to Diane English's comments. While addressing a rally in Columbus, Mississippi, Quayle denied that he ever attacked single parents or said that single parent families doesn't meet Republican value tests. He blamed Hollywood for misleading people regarding his views. Soon after Quayle's comments, Republicans were trailing to Democrats among single parents in polls.

Initially, the general opinion polls showed the president leading with almost 45% to Clinton's 25%, and Perot's 24%, but his lead soon reduced in May, when Perot started leading the polls. As Perot's polling numbers increased, Bush wrote in his diary that Perot is "outrageously ill-suited to be president of the United States". When Perot dropped out of the race, Clinton gained a huge bounce in his polling numbers, as a result Bush's poll numbers dropped from 57% to 32%. In late August, even after RNC, Bush's polling numbers managed to reach only 36% to Clinton's 53%, which Bush called "discouraging as hell". Upon Perot's re-entrance in the race, Clinton was leading over both Bush and Perot.

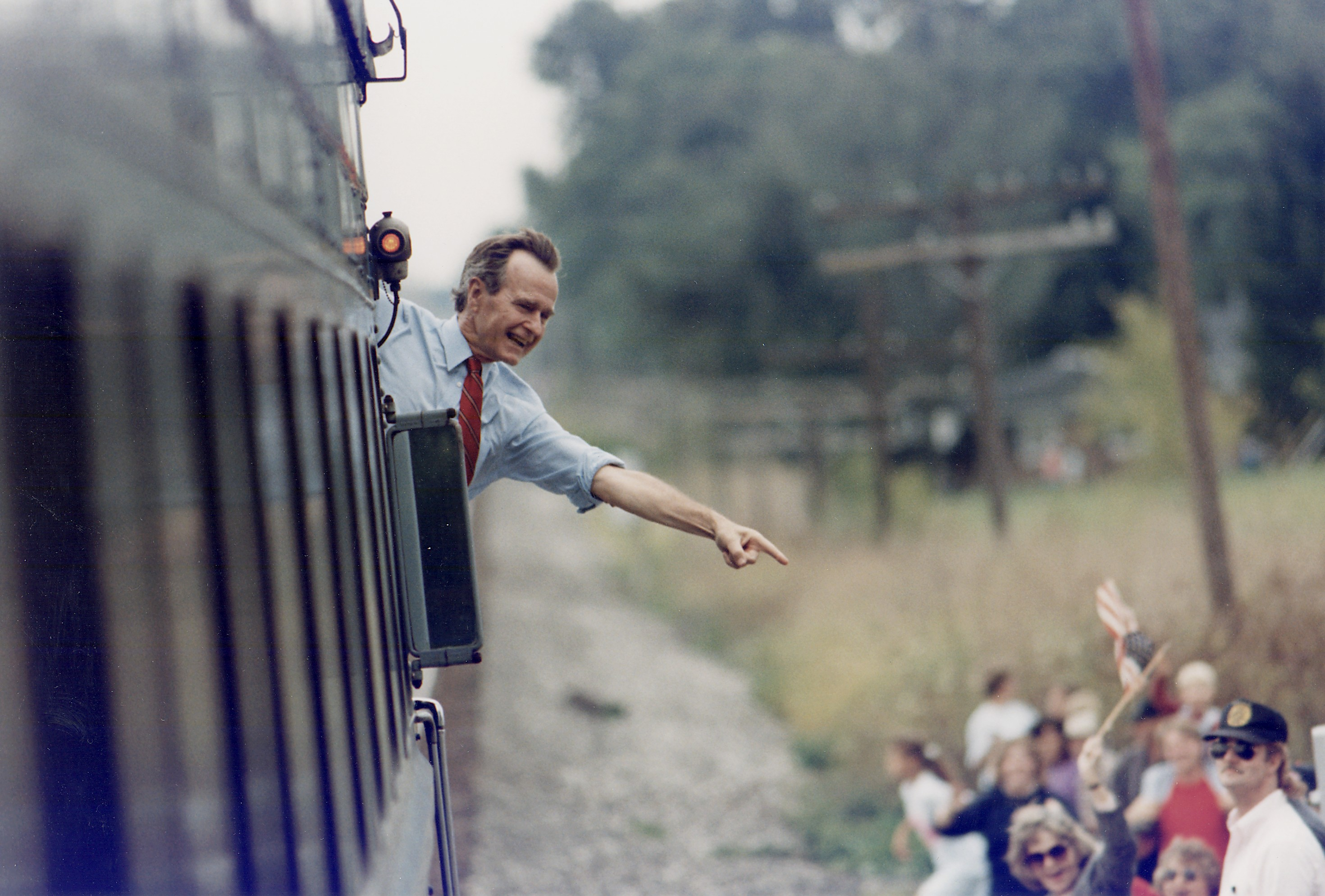
Bush waves from the train outside of Bowling Green during his whistle-stop campaign.

In late September, during a rally in Springfield, Missouri, Bush said:

I hear candidate Clinton is up in Michigan today talking about debates. Well, I propose a debate for him today: candidate Clinton versus Governor Clinton. You see, we've all heard what candidate Clinton says he can do for America. But that's very different from what Governor Clinton has done to Arkansas, to the good people of Arkansas. And I want to stress this: My argument is not with the people of Arkansas, it is not. They are good, decent, hard-working people. Frankly, they deserve treatment better than they've received from Governor Clinton. So here we go.

Bush strongly emphasized his foreign policy success like the Gulf War and the United States invasion of Panama. By the end of September 1992, he had addressed many rallies along with Quayle, criticizing Clinton's campaign either for his economic plan or for his views on foreign affairs or national security. On September 26, Bush conducted a whistle stop train tour on a train named The Spirit of America starting in Columbus, Ohio, and covering various cities on its route, including Marysville, Arlington, Bowling Green, and Plymouth. The next day, he continued his campaign by train, visiting Wixom and Grand Blanc in Michigan.

=== October ===
Newspaper endorsements
- Chicago Tribune in Chicago, Illinois
- Arizona Republic in Phoenix, Arizona
- Houston Chronicle in Houston, Texas
- New York Post in New York City
- Dallas Morning News in Dallas, Texas
- San Diego Union Tribune in San Diego, California
- San Francisco Chronicle in San Francisco, California
- Omaha World-Herald in Omaha, Nebraska
- Cincinnati Enquirer in Cincinnati, Ohio
- Richmond Times-Dispatch in Richmond, Virginia
- San Antonio Express-News in San Antonio, Texas
- New Orleans Times-Picayune in New Orleans, Louisiana
- Oklahoman in Oklahoma City
- Detroit News in Detroit, Michigan
- Northwest Indiana Times in Munster, Indiana

Bush supported cutting domestic spending, taxes, and proposed to change budget accounting. He stressed his Clean Air Act, and blamed the Democratic-controlled congress for ignoring his plan of cutting dependency on foreign oil. He opposed national health insurances and wanted to preserve the public-private health care system through comprehensive reforms. He often called Clinton health care plan as "payroll tax for government take-over of healthcare". Emphasizing on his welfare reform, he promised to "strike a new course" to build moral and family values of people on welfare. He supported new welfare approaches by states through exemption from federal laws. He continued Reagan's supply-side economics, but while campaigning, claimed that his government's platform supports increased access to capital for business expansion, exporting long-term investment and capital to bring new products to the market. The Bush campaign promised across-the-board tax cuts and supported enterprise zones in cities.

The Bush campaign advertised extensively, spending $38.5 million on paid advertisements on television and radio. Several of the Bush campaign's commercials were based on a single theme that Clinton would impose taxes on energy, that he dubbed a "carbon tax" that would eventually drive up utility bills and cost jobs. The ads attacked Clinton over his tax increase as governor of Arkansas, criticized his health care plan and his inconsistency on major issues like term limits and defense. Bush's campaign focused on the notion that America must be a "military superpower, an economic superpower, and an export superpower". With Robert Mosbacher as the fundraiser, Bush campaign and managed to raise $101,936,902 (equivalent to $233,872,309 in 2025) through fundraising. Clinton's advisor, James Carville, coined a phrase "It's the economy, stupid", which was often used to attack Bush campaign. Bush's oldest son George W. Bush was involved in the campaign as a campaign advisor to the president, one of the seven people the president appointed to manage his campaign. As an advisor, he warned the Bush campaign that Perot should be taken seriously as a possible presidential candidate. On October 6, a month before election day, Bush signed an appropriation that would provide $5 million to a prospective transition. If Clinton were to win, the appropriation would give his transition team $3.5 million, and give $1.5 million to Bush's administration to aid them in the transition.

Bush took part in a series of three presidential debates between himself, Clinton, and Perot. Perot was eligible for participating in debates, as he had re-entered the race in early October. Quayle participated in the vice-presidential debate between himself, Gore, and Stockdale. Bush was criticized for his performance in debates. In the polls conducted by CNN/USA Today after each debate, 20% of people said that he won the debates on average, while 39% went with Clinton, 30% went with Perot and 11% were undecided. During a debate, Bush said that he strongly supported term limits for members of the US Congress, limiting their term to 24 years, which Clinton opposed. Bush was seen on national camera checking his watch while being asked about the effect of the national debt on him personally.

== Election day ==
Map of the 1992 U.S. presidential election, blue represents Clinton winning that state/district, red represents Bush winning that state.

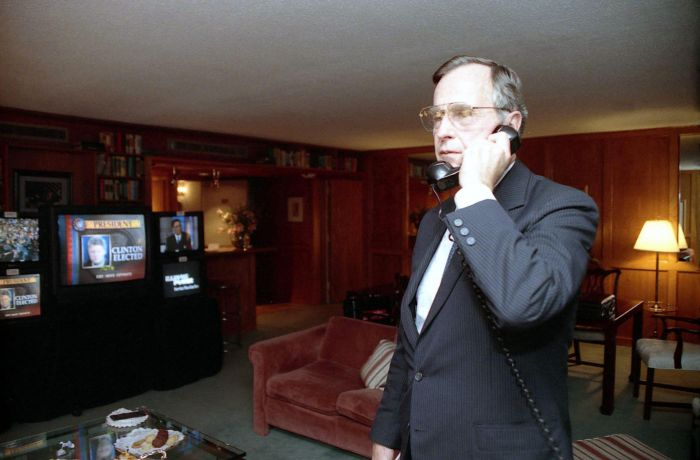
President Bush on election night 1992.

A few days before election day, Gallup polls showed Bush 12% behind Clinton. On November 3, 1992, Bush lost the election to Democratic nominee Bill Clinton, coming in second place. Clinton won 370 electoral votes and 43.0% of the popular vote while Bush only received 168 electoral votes and 37.5% of the popular vote. Ross Perot finished in third place, winning no electoral votes but receiving 18.9% of the popular vote. President Bush's 37.5% was the lowest percentage for a sitting president seeking re-election since William Howard Taft, in 1912 (23.2%), as the 1912 election was a three-way race (that time between Taft, Wilson, and Theodore Roosevelt). It was also the lowest percentage for a major party candidate since Alf Landon received 36.5% of the vote in 1936. Bush had a lower percentage of the popular vote than Herbert Hoover, who was defeated in 1932 (39.7%). Bush did not get a majority of the votes in any state. His strongest performance was in Nebraska's 3rd congressional district, where he had 49.7% of votes. The same night, he conceded to Clinton and said:

The people have spoken, and we respect the majesty of the democratic system. I just called Governor Clinton over in Little Rock and offered my congratulations. He did run a strong campaign. I wish him well in the White House, and I want the country to know that our entire administration will work closely with his team to ensure the smooth transition of power.

It was popularly believed that Perot was spoiler and cost Bush his re-election. White House Chief of Staff and one of Bush's re-election campaign manager James Baker pointed out that "Perot took two out of every three votes from traditional Republican voters." But, in a 1999 study conducted by the American Journal of Political Science, it was estimated that Perot's candidacy did not hurt Bush's campaign, but ended up splitting Clinton's votes, reducing his margin of victory over Bush by seven percentage points. By that measure, if Perot had not been in the race, Clinton would have won by an even greater majority. When Perot was asked about being a spoiler in the election, he replied, "There is no way I can be a spoiler, it was already spoiled when I started". (Note: He was referring to America's $4 trillion debt and $400 billion deficit.) The outcome of the 1992 U.S. presidential election has been explained largely as a function of voters' perceptions of Bush's economic performance. The economy submerged questions about Bill Clinton's character, awarding the advantage to the Democrat.

=== Results ===
Electoral results
Presidential candidate	Party	Home state	Popular vote		Electoral vote	Running mate		
Presidential candidate	Party	Home state	Count	Percentage	Electoral vote	Vice-presidential candidate	Home state	Electoral vote
Bill Clinton	Democratic	Arkansas	44,909,889	43.01%	370	Al Gore	Tennessee	370
George H. W. Bush (incumbent)	Republican	Texas	39,104,550	37.45%	168	Dan Quayle (incumbent)	Indiana	168
Ross Perot	Independent	Texas	19,743,821	18.91%	0	James Stockdale	California	0
Andre Marrou	Libertarian	Alaska	290,087	0.28%	0	Nancy Lord	Nevada	0
Bo Gritz	Populist	Nevada	106,152	0.10%	0	Cyril Minett	New Mexico	0
Lenora Fulani	New Alliance Party	New York	73,622	0.07%	0	Maria Elizabeth Muñoz	California	0
Howard Phillips	U.S. Taxpayers Party	Virginia	43,369	0.04%	0	Albion Knight Jr.	Florida	0
Other			152,516	0.13%	—	Other		—
Total			104,423,923	100%	538			538
Needed to win					270			270

== Aftermath ==
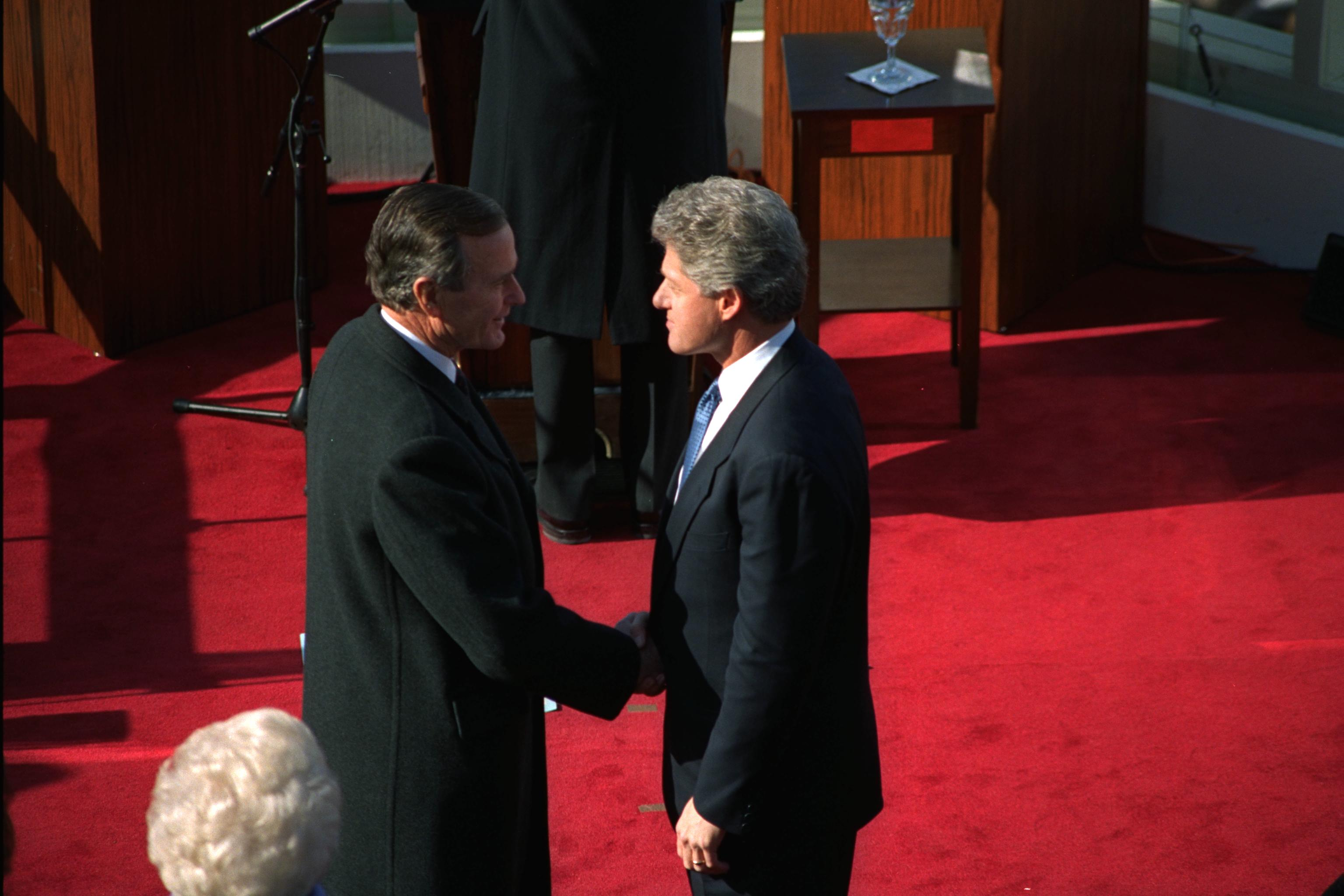
Bush with President Bill Clinton shortly after his inauguration.

Following his defeat in the election, Bush publicly proclaimed his desire for a smooth transition between his and the incoming administration. Bush is often praised for his efforts and co-operation in the transition. His broken promise of never raising taxes is often considered one of several important factors leading to his defeat. A few hours before Clinton's inauguration, Bush left him a handwritten letter in the Oval Office which ended as "Your success is now our country's success. I am rooting hard for you". Clinton appreciated the letter, and later said, "No words of mine or others can better reveal the heart of who he was than those he wrote himself." Clinton was inaugurated on January 20, 1993 as 42nd president of the United States, with Bush attending the inauguration. Bush left office with a 56% approval rating and a 37% disapproval rating.

Shortly after leaving office, Bush's oldest son George W. Bush was elected the governor of Texas in 1994. He was re-elected governor in 1998, along with his younger brother Jeb Bush being elected the governor of Florida. In a 1999 interview with Jim Lehrer, on being asked what he was thinking as he checked his wristwatch, he replied:

They took a little incident like that to show that I was, you know, out of it. They made a huge thing out of that. Now, was I glad when the damn thing was over? Yeah, and maybe that's why I was looking at it, only 10 more minutes of this crap, I mean [Jim laughs] Go ahead and use it. I'm a free spirit now.

The same year, Dan Quayle announced a run for president, challenging the Republican front-runner George W. Bush. Quayle attacked Bush saying, "we do not want another candidate who needs on-the-job training". George W. Bush eventually won the Republican nomination and elected the 43rd president in 2000 after he narrowly defeated Vice President Al Gore; he was re-elected president in 2004 and remained in office until 2009. During his presidency, he led efforts to have his father and Clinton work together to provide help and private aid to those affected by the 2004 Indian Ocean earthquake and tsunami. In a 2012 book, The Presidents Club by Nancy Gibbs and Michael Duffy, they wrote, "Bush [George H. W. Bush] would go so far as to suggest more than once that he might be the father that Clinton had always lacked—a notion that the younger man did not dispute."

== Endorsements ==
List of George H. W. Bush 1992 presidential campaign endorsements

Former Presidents

- Ronald Reagan (40th President of the United States)
- Gerald Ford (38th President of the United States)
- Richard Nixon (37th President of United States)

Senators

- Kit Bond (R-MO)
- John Danforth (R-MO)
- Pete Domenici (R-NM)
- Slade Gorton (R-WA)
- Bob Kasten (R-WI)
- Mitch McConnell (R-KY)
- Don Nickles (R-OK)
- Larry Pressler (R-SD)
- William Roth (R-DE)
- Alan K. Simpson (R-WY)
- Strom Thurmond (R-SC)

Former Senators

- James Abdnor (R-SD)
- Howard Baker (R-TN)
- Charles Mathias (R-MD)

Representatives

- Richard Baker (R-LA)
- Cass Ballenger (R-NC)
- Helen Delich Bentley (R-MD)
- Doug Bereuter (R-NE)
- John Boehner (R-OH)
- William Broomfield (R-MI)
- Lawrence Coughlin (R-PA)
- Phil Crane (R-OH)
- William L. Dickinson (R-AL)
- Jimmy Duncan (R-TN)
- Gary Franks (R-CT)
- Dean Gallo (R-NJ)
- Wayne Gilchrest (R-MD)
- Paul Gillmor (R-OH)
- Dave Hobson (R-OH)
- Clyde C. Holloway (R-LA)
- Nancy Johnson (R-CT)
- Sam Johnson (R-PA)
- Bob Livingston (R-LA)
- Alex McMillan (R-NC)
- Connie Morella (R-MD)
- Tom Petri (R-WI)
- Jimmy Quillen (R-TN)
- Ralph Regula (R-OH)
- Hal Rogers (R-KY)
- Marge Roukema (R-NJ)
- Daniel Schaefer (R-CO)
- Steven Schiff (R-NM))
- Jim Sensenbrenner (R-WI)
- Chris Shays (R-CT)
- Joe Skeen (R-NM)
- Chris Smith (R-NJ)
- Don Sundquist (R-TN)
- Bob Walker (R-PA)
- Curt Weldon (R-PA)
- Chalmers Wylie (R-OH)

Former Representatives

- Gilbert Gude (R-MD)
- Lawrence Hogan (R-MD)
- John G. Rowland (R-CT)
- Charles Thone (R-NE)

Governors

- John Ashcroft (R-MO)
- Carroll A. Campbell Jr. (R-SC)
- Mike Castle (R-DE)
- Jim Edgar (R-IL)
- John Engler (R-MI)
- Kirk Fordice (R-MS)
- James G. Martin (R-NC)
- George S. Mickelson (R-SD)
- William Donald Schaefer (D-MD)
- Tommy Thompson (R-WI)
- George Voinovich (R-OH)

Former Governors

- Lamar Alexander (R-TN)
- Garrey Carruthers (R-NM)
- Bill Janklow (R-SD)
- Thomas Kean (R-NJ)
- Jim Rhodes (R-OH)
- Dave Treen (R-LA)

Lieutenant Governor

- Connie Binsfeld (R-MI)
- Walter Dale Miller (R-SD)
- Dale E. Wolf (R-DE)

Secretary of States

- W. Fox McKeithen (R-LA)
- Bob Taft (R-OH)

Mayors

- Steve Bartlett of Dallas (R-TX)
- Emory Folmar of Montgomery (R-AL)
- Greg Lashutka of Columbus (R-OH)
- Richard Vinroot of Charlotte (R-NC)

Former Mayors

- Donna Owens of Toledo (R-OH)

Individuals

- Wrestler Ric Flair
- Radio Host Bob Gant
- Basketball Coach Bill Laimbeer
- Quarterback Bart Starr

Actors and Actresses

- Charlton Heston
- Cheryl Ladd
- George Lindsey
- Gerald McRaney
- Chuck Norris
- Arnold Schwarzenegger
- Bruce Willis

Comedians

- Ray Combs
- Phyllis Diller
- Bob Hope
- Fred Travalena

Musicians

- Singer Roy Acuff
- Guitarist Chet Atkins
- Band Baillie & the Boys
- Singer Pat Boone
- Singer-Songwriter Mark Chesnutt
- Rapper Eazy-E
- Singer Larry Gatlin
- Singer Lee Greenwood
- Singer Naomi Judd
- Singer Wynona Judd
- Singer Mel McDaniel
- Singer Paul Overstreet
- Singer Mitch Ryder
- Singer Ricky Skaggs
- Singer-Songwriter T. G. Sheppard
- Band The Oak Ridge Boys

== See also ==
- George H. W. Bush 1988 presidential campaign

== Bibliography ==
- Allen, Thomas B. (1992). CNN Guide to the 1992 Election: Change vs. Trust. Turner Pub. ISBN 978-1-878685-25-4.
- Bush, Doro (2006). My Father, My President: A Personal Account of the Life of George H. W. Bush. Grand Central Publishing. ISBN 978-0-446-57990-2. OL 7537206M.
- Jelen, Ted G. (2001). Ross for Boss: The Perot Phenomenon and Beyond. SUNY Press. ISBN 978-0-7914-4853-3.
- Kurtz, Howard (1997). Hot Air: All Talk, All the Time. New York: Basic Books. ISBN 978-0-465-03074-3.
- Meacham, Jon (2015). Destiny and Power: The American Odyssey of George Herbert Walker Bush. Random House. ISBN 978-1-4000-6765-7.
