= Aiken Standard =

U.S. newspaper in South Carolina, founded 1867

- Type: Daily newspaper
- Format: Broadsheet
- Owner: Evening Post Industries
- Publisher: Randy Mitchell
- Editor: John Boyette
- Founded: 1867
- Headquarters: 326 Rutland Drive N.W., PO Box 456; Aiken, SC 29801; US
- Website: aikenstandard.com

Aiken Standard is a daily newspaper published from Aiken, South Carolina, United States. It was established in 1867. It was called the Aiken Press.

== History ==
The newspaper passed through the hands of several owners during the 1800s. One of the paper's most prominent early owners was James F. Byrnes. Byrnes, who was a congressman, U.S. senator, South Carolina governor, U.S. Secretary of State, Associate Justice of the U.S. Supreme Court and "Assistant" to the President of the United States.

Under Byrnes and his partner, Alva Lorenz, the Journal and Review developed into Aiken's main newspaper. Byrnes and Lorenz operated the Journal and Review until 1912, when Lorenz bought out Byrnes' interest in the newspaper.

In 1953, Lorenz sold the newspaper to Benjamin Josey King and his wife, Annie Howell King. The Kings already owned a weekly newspaper called the Aiken Standard. The Kings merged the two papers to create the Aiken Standard and Review. The Aiken Standard and Review operated in a small building on Richland Avenue, using Linotype machines and hot lead production methods that had been common in newspaper plants for many decades.

The Evening Post Publishing Company of Charleston purchased the newspaper in 1968. Construction of a modern, 24,000-square-foot (2,200 m^{2}) newspaper publishing plant, which featured a new offset press, was begun at once, and was completed, equipped and occupied within a year. The newspaper closed out the old operation with its issue of Friday, September 26, 1969, and published its first issue from the new plant on September 29, 1969. By this time, the newspaper's name had been shortened, and it became the Aiken Standard of today.

Samuel A. Cothran was the modern Aiken Standard's first Publisher and Editor. Under the leadership of Mr. Cothran, in 1985 a new, faster and larger press was installed, and almost simultaneously a Sunday morning edition was introduced. He remained Publisher and Editor until his retirement in 1989.

In April 1989, Scott B. Hunter became the new Publisher of the Aiken Standard. On August 19, 1989, the first Saturday morning edition was produced.

The Evening Post Industries owns the Aiken Standard, the Post and Courier in Charleston, and other daily newspapers and television stations throughout the country.

In December 2023, Ellen C. Priest became the president and publisher of the Aiken Standard, replacing Scott Hunter who retired that month.

In April 2024, the newspaper announced it will switch from carrier to postal delivery.
