= The Daily Nonpareil =

Daily American newspaper

- Type: Daily newspaper
- Owner: Lee Enterprises
- Publisher: Thomas Schmitt
- Managing editor: Courtney Brummer-Clark
- News editor: Mike Brownlee
- Founded: May 2, 1857; 168 years ago
- Headquarters: 300 West Broadway, Suite 108; Council Bluffs, Iowa 51503
- Country: United States
- Circulation: 3,944 Daily (as of 2023)
- ISSN: 1046-1833
- OCLC number: 12895103
- Website: nonpareilonline.com

The Daily Nonpareil is a daily newspaper serving Council Bluffs and a 10-county area of southwest Iowa.

== History ==
The Daily Nonpareil is southwest Iowa's largest newspaper. It was founded on May 2, 1857.

The paper was acquired in 2011 by Berkshire Hathaway, when it bought the paper's then parent, the Omaha World-Herald and its other subsidiary newspapers in Kearney, Grand Island, York, North Platte, and Scottsbluff, Nebraska. The World-Herald acquired partial ownership in 2000 and full ownership in 2007.

In 2020, Lee Enterprises purchased BH Media Group's newspapers. This purchase included The Daily Nonpareil, the Clarinda Herald-Journal, the Shenandoah Valley News Today, the Logan-Woodbine Twiner, and the Denison Bulletin-Review. On March 16, 2020, Lee officially took over as The Daily Nonpareil's parent company.

Unusually, the paper made a dual-party endorsement in 2016, endorsing both Bernie Sanders and John Kasich, as the best-qualified nominees of the two major parties.

From 1965 to 2000, it was owned by several newspaper chains, including Thomson Newspapers and MediaNews Group.

Starting June 20, 2023, the print edition of the newspaper will be reduced to three days a week: Tuesday, Thursday and Saturday. Also, the newspaper will transition from being delivered by a traditional newspaper delivery carrier to mail delivery by the U.S. Postal Service.
