= Danville Register & Bee =

Newspaper in Danville, Virginia

- Type: Daily newspaper
- Format: Broadsheet
- Owner(s): Lee Enterprises
- Publisher: Kelly E. Mirt
- Managing editor: Michael Owens
- Founded: February 1882; 143 years ago, as The Daily Register
- Headquarters: 700 Monument Street; Danville, Virginia 24541
- Country: United States
- Circulation: 3,659 daily (as of 2023)
- ISSN: 1527-5620
- OCLC number: 30826346
- Website: godanriver.com

The Danville Register & Bee is a daily newspaper serving Danville, Virginia, United States. It is owned by Lee Enterprises.

== History ==
The paper was previously published as The Danville Register and The Bee. The two were merged on July 1, 1989. The Register was founded as The Daily Register, in February 1882. The Bee was founded as the Danville Daily Bee, in 1899.

Starting June 17, 2023, the print edition of the newspaper was reduced to three days a week: Tuesday, Thursday, and Saturday. It also went from being delivered by a traditional newspaper delivery carrier, to being delivered via the U.S. Postal Service.
