= WSEK =

WSEK may refer to:

- WSEK (AM), a radio station (910 AM) licensed to serve Burnside, Kentucky, United States
- WSEK-FM, a radio station (93.9 FM) licensed to serve Burnside, Kentucky
