= List of Delta Alpha Pi (honor society) chapters =

Delta Alpha Pi is an American honor society founded in 2004 to recognize high-achieving college and university students with disabilities It was established in 2004 at East Stroudsburg University of Pennsylvania Following is a list of chartered Delta Alpha Pi chapters.

Chapter	Charter date and range	Institution	Location	State	Status	Ref.
Alpha	2004	East Stroudsburg University of Pennsylvania	East Stroudsburg, Pennsylvania	PA		
Beta	2005	Pennsylvania Western University, Edinboro	Edinboro, Pennsylvania	PA		
Gamma	2006	Shippensburg University of Pennsylvania	Shippensburg, Pennsylvania	PA		
Delta	2006	Geneva College	Beaver Falls, Pennsylvania	PA		
Epsilon	2006	Bentley University	Waltham, Massachusetts	MA		
Zeta	2006	Fitchburg State University	Fitchburg, Massachusetts	MA	Active	
Eta	2006	Missouri State University	Springfield, Missouri	MO		
Theta	2007	Centenary University	Hackettstown, New Jersey	NJ		
Iota	2007	Kutztown University of Pennsylvania	Kutztown, Pennsylvania	PA	Active	
Kappa	2007	Pennsylvania Western University, California	California, Pennsylvania	PA		
Lambda	2007	Long Beach City College	Long Beach, California	CA		
Mu	2007	West Chester University	West Chester, Pennsylvania	PA	Active	
Nu	2008	Clemson University	Clemson, South Carolina	SC	Active	
Xi	2008	George Mason University	Fairfax, Virginia	VA	Active	
Omicron	2008	Bloomsburg University of Pennsylvania	Bloomsburg, Pennsylvania	PA		
Pi	2008	University of South Carolina	Columbia, South Carolina	SC	Active	
Rho	2008	Northeastern University	Boston, Massachusetts	MA		
Sigma	2008	Baltimore City Community College	Baltimore, Maryland	MD		
Tau	2008	North Central College	Naperville, Illinois	IL		
Upsilon	2008	University of South Alabama	Mobile, Alabama	AL		
Phi	2008	Penn West Clarion	Clarion, Pennsylvania	PA		
Chi	2008	Southern Oregon University	Ashland, Oregon	OR		
Psi	2008	East Tennessee State University	Johnson City, Tennessee	TN	Active	
Omega	2008	Point Loma Nazarene University	San Diego, California	CA		
Alpha Alpha	2008	Metropolitan State University of Denver	Denver, Colorado	CO	Active	
Alpha Beta	2008	University of New Mexico	Albuquerque, New Mexico	NM		
Alpha Gamma	2008	Adrian College	Adrian, Michigan	MI	Active	
Alpha Delta	200x ?					
Alpha Epsilon	2009	Towson University	Towson, Maryland	MD		
Alpha Zeta	2009	Iowa State University	Ames, Iowa	IA		
Alpha Eta	2009	University of Louisiana at Lafayette	Lafayette, Louisiana	LA	Active	
Alpha Theta	2009	Sonoma State University	Rohnert Park, California	CA		
Alpha Iota	2009	University of Pittsburgh	Pittsburgh, Pennsylvania	PA	Active	
Alpha Kappa	2009	Kansas State University	Manhattan, Kansas	KS		
Alpha Lambda	2009	California State University, Northridge	Los Angeles, California	CA		
Alpha Mu	2010	Lamar University	Beaumont, Texas	TX		
Alpha Nu	2010	University of North Texas	Denton, Texas	TX	Active	
Alpha Xi	2010	University of Central Florida	Orlando, Florida	FL		
Alpha Omicron	2010	University of Texas at Arlington	Arlington, Texas	TX		
Alpha Pi	2010	Union College	Schenectady, New York	NE		
Alpha Rho	2010	University of Connecticut	Storrs, Connecticut	CT		
Alpha Sigma	2010	Carroll Community College	Westminster, Maryland	MD		
Alpha Tau	2010	Southeast Missouri State University	Cape Girardeau, Missouri	MO		
Alpha Upsilon	2010	Southeastern Louisiana University	Hammond, Louisiana	LA		
Alpha Phi	2010					
Alpha Chi	2010	Hofstra University	Hempstead, New York	NY	Active	
Alpha Psi	2010	University of Delaware	Newark, Delaware	DE	Active	
Alpha Omega	2010	Mitchell College	New London, Connecticut	CT		
Beta Alpha	2010	Notre Dame College	South Euclid, Ohio	OH		
Beta Beta	2011	University of Missouri	Columbia, Missouri	MO		
Beta Gamma	2011	Rowan University	Glassboro, New Jersey	NJ		
Beta Delta	2011	Marist University	Poughkeepsie, New York	NY		
Beta Epsilon	2011	Molloy College	Rockville Centre, New York	NY		
Beta Zeta	2011	Indiana University of Pennsylvania	Indiana, Pennsylvania	PA		
Beta Eta	2011	University of North Florida	Jacksonville, Florida	FL		
Beta Theta	2011	University of Massachusetts Lowell	Lowell, Massachusetts	MA		
Beta Iota	2011	Virginia State University	Ettrick, Virginia	VA		
Beta Kappa	2011	North Shore Community College	Danvers, Massachusetts	MA	Active	
Beta Lambda	2011	University of New Haven	West Haven, Connecticut	MA		
Beta Mu	2011	University of Michigan	Ann Arbor, Michigan	MI		
Beta Nu	2011	Brigham Young University	Provo, Utah	UT	Active	
Beta Xi	2012	University of Lynchburg	Lynchburg, Virginia	VA		
Beta Omicron	2012	University of Texas at Dallas	Richardson, Texas	TX		
Beta Pi	2012	Colorado State University	Fort Collins, Colorado	CO		
Beta Rho	2012	Harford Community College	Bel Air, Maryland	MD		
Beta Sigma	2012	Penn State Berks	Spring Township. Pennsylvania	PA		
Beta Tau	2012	Washington State University	Pullman, Washington	WA		
Beta Upsilon	2012	St. Thomas Aquinas College	Sparkill, New York	NY		
Beta Phi	2012	University of Texas at El Paso	El Paso, Texas	TX		
Beta Chi	2012	Florida State University	Tallahassee, Florida	FL		
Beta Psi	2012	Cornell University	Ithaca, New York	NY		
Beta Omega	2013	Cabrini University	Radnor Township, Pennsylvania	PA		
Gamma Alpha	2013	Wilmington University	New Castle, Delaware	DE		
Gamma Beta	2013	Community College of Baltimore County	Baltimore County, Maryland	MD		
Gamma Gamma	2013	Hood College	Frederick, Maryland	MD		
Gamma Delta	2013	Brevard College	Brevard, North Carolina	NC		
Gamma Epsilon	2013	University of Baltimore	Baltimore, Maryland	MD		
Gamma Zeta	2013	Strayer University	Washington, D.C.	VA		
Gamma Eta	2013	Western Connecticut State University	Danbury, Connecticut	CT		
Gamma Theta	2013	Fashion Institute of Technology	New York City, New York	NY		
Gamma Iota	2013	Lebanon Valley College	Annville Township, Pennsylvania	PA		
Gamma Kappa	2013	University of Maryland, Baltimore County	Baltimore, Maryland	MD	Active	
Gamma Lambda	2014	Western Michigan University	Kalamazoo, Michigan	MI		
Gamma Mu	2014	Florida Gulf Coast University	Fort Myers, Florida	FL		
Gamma Nu	2014	Purdue University Fort Wayne	Fort Wayne, Indiana	IN		
Gamma Xi	2014	University at Buffalo	Buffalo, New York	NY		
Gamma Omicron	2014	University of Tennessee	Knoxville, Tennessee	TN	Active	
Gamma Pi	2014	Aquinas College	Grand Rapids, Michigan	MI		
Gamma Rho	2014	University of Maryland, College Park	College Park, Maryland	MD		
Gamma Sigma	2014	University of Wisconsin–Whitewater	Whitewater, Wisconsin	WI		
Gamma Tau	2014	Hilbert College	Hamburg, New York	NY		
Gamma Upsilon	2014	University of Arizona Global Campus	Online	AZ	Active	
Gamma Phi	2014	University of Texas at San Antonio	San Antonio, Texas	TX		
Gamma Chi	2014	Worcester State University	Worcester, Massachusetts	MA		
Gamma Psi	2014	Eastern Illinois University	Charleston, Illinois	IL		
Gamma Omega	2014	Somerset Community College	Somerset, Kentucky	KY		
Delta Alpha	2015	University of San Francisco	San Francisco, California	CA		
Delta Beta	2015	Santa Monica College	Santa Monica, California	CA		
Delta Gamma	2015	Syracuse University	Syracuse, New York	NY		
Delta Delta	2015	State University of New York at New Paltz	New Paltz, New York	NY	Active	
Delta Epsilon	2015	Davis & Elkins College	Elkins, West Virginia	WV		
Delta Zeta	2015	Gardner–Webb University	Boiling Springs, North Carolina	NC		
Delta Eta	2015	University of Denver	Denver, Colorado	CO		
Delta Theta	2016	LaGuardia Community College	Queens, New York	NY		
Delta Iota	2016	Texas State University	San Marcos, Texas	TX		
Delta Kappa	2016	Temple University	Philadelphia, Pennsylvania	PA		
Delta Lambda	2016	East Central University	Ada, Oklahoma	OK		
Delta Mu	2016	University of Hartford	West Hartford, Connecticut	CT		
Delta Nu	2016	State University of New York at Old Westbury	Old Westbury, New York	NY		
Delta Xi	2016	Madison Area Technical College	Madison, Wisconsin	WI		
Delta Omicron	2016	Old Dominion University	Norfolk, Virginia	VA		
Delta Pi	2016	Alliant International University	San Diego, California	CA		
Delta Rho	2016	Loyola University Maryland	Baltimore, Maryland	MD		
Delta Sigma	2016	Salisbury University	Salisbury, Maryland	MD	Active	
Delta Tau	2016	Rock Valley College	Rockford, Illinois	IL		
Delta Upsilon	2016	University of the Arts	Philadelphia, Pennsylvania	PA		
Delta Phi	2016	Baldwin Wallace University	Berea, Ohio	OH		
Delta Chi	2016	American International College	Springfield, Massachusetts	MA		
Delta Psi	2016	Northern Kentucky University	Highland Heights, Kentucky	KY	Active	
Delta Omega	2017	Community College of Allegheny County	Pittsburgh, Pennsylvania	PA		
Epsilon Alpha	2017	State University of New York at Delhi	Delhi, New York	NY	Active	
Epsilon Beta	2017	Utah Valley University	Orem, Utah	UT		
Epsilon Gamma	2017	Our Lady of the Lake University	San Antonio, Texas	TX		
Epsilon Delta	2017	University at Albany, SUNY	Albany, New York	NY		
Epsilon Epsilon	2017	University of Alaska Anchorage	Anchorage, Alaska	AK		
Epsilon Zeta	2017	California State University, San Bernardino	San Bernardino, California	CA		
Epsilon Eta	2017	University of the District of Columbia	Washington, D.C.	DC		
Epsilon Theta	2017	Mount Wachusett Community College	Gardner, Massachusetts	MA		
Epsilon Iota	2017	Milwaukee Area Technical College	Milwaukee, Wisconsin	WI		
Epsilon Kappa	2017	Wright State University	Fairborn, Ohio	OH		
Epsilon Lambda	2017	Southern Nazarene University	Bethany, Oklahoma	OK		
Epsilon Mu	2017	Caldwell University	Caldwell, New Jersey	NJ		
Epsilon Nu	2017	Eastern Kentucky University	Richmond, Kentucky	KY		
Epsilon Xi	2017	Coppin State University	Baltimore, Maryland	MD		
Epsilon Omicron	2017	St. Ambrose University	Davenport, Iowa	IA		
Epsilon Pi	2017	San Diego State University	San Diego, California	CA		
Epsilon Rho	2017	Stevenson University	Baltimore County, Maryland	MD		
Epsilon Sigma	2018	Siena Heights University	Adrian, Michigan	MI		
Epsilon Tau	2018	University of Florida	Gainesville, Florida	FL	Active	
Epsilon Upsilon	2018	Winthrop University	Rock Hill, South Carolina	SC		
Epsilon Phi	2018	Cosumnes River College	Sacramento, California	CA		
Epsilon Chi	2018	Buffalo State University	Buffalo, New York	NY		
Epsilon Psi	2018	University of Alabama at Birmingham	Birmingham, Alabama	AL	Active	
Epsilon Omega	2018	University of California, Irvine	Irvine, California	CA		
Zeta Alpha	2018	State University of New York at Cobleskill	Cobleskill, New York	NY		
Zeta Beta	2018	Butler University	Indianapolis, Indiana	IN		
Zeta Gamma	2018	Cleveland State University	Cleveland, Ohio	OH		
Zeta Delta	2019	DePaul University	Chicago, Illinois	IL	Active	
Zeta Epsilon	2019	California State University, Sacramento	Sacramento, California	CA		
Zeta Zeta	2019	University of North Alabama	Florence, Alabama	AL	Active	
Zeta Eta	2019	University of Central Oklahoma	Edmond, Oklahoma	OK		
Zeta Theta	2019	Emporia State University	Emporia, Kansas	KS		
Zeta Iota	2019	Texas Southmost College	Brownsville, Texas	TX		
Zeta Kappa	2019	Bryant University	Smithfield, Rhode Island	RI		
Zeta Lambda	2019	John Jay College of Criminal Justice	New York City, New York	NY		
Zeta Mu	2019	University of Mary Washington	Fredericksburg, Virginia	VA	Active	
Zeta Nu	2019	Randolph–Macon College	Ashland, Virginia	VA		
Zeta Xi	2019	Indiana University South Bend	South Bend, Indiana	IN		
Zeta Omicron	2019	Loras Collage	Dubuque, Iowa	IA		
Zeta Pi	2019	Community College of Allegheny County, Boyce Campus	Monroeville, Pennsylvania	PA		
Zeta Rho	2019	University of Memphis	Memphis, Tennessee	TN		
Zeta Sigma	2020	Universities at Shady Grove	Rockville, Maryland	MD	Active	
Zeta Tau	2020	Moorpark College	Moorpark, California	CA		
Zeta Upsilon	2020	Springfield College	Springfield, Massachusetts	MA		
Zeta Phi	2020	University of North Carolina at Greensboro	Greensboro, North Carolina	NC		
Zeta Chi	2020	Capella University	Online	MN		
Zeta Psi	2020	University of California, Riverside	Riverside, California	CA		
Zeta Omega	2020	Bennett College	Greensboro, North Carolina	NC		
Eta Alpha	2020	Georgia State University	Atlanta, Georgia	GA		
Eta Beta	2020	Rutgers University–Camden	Camden, New Jersey	NJ		
Eta Gamma	2020	University of California, San Diego	San Diego, California	CA		
Eta Delta	2021	San Diego City College	San Diego, California	CA		
Eta Epsilon	2021	University of Southern California	Los Angeles, California	CA		
Eta Zeta	2021	California State University, Channel Islands	Camarillo, California	CA	Active	
Eta Eta	2021	Columbus State University	Columbus, Georgia	GA		
Eta Theta	2021	CUNY School of Professional Studies	New York City, New York	NY	Active	
Eta Iota	2021	Community College of Beaver County	Beaver County, Pennsylvania	PA		
Eta Kappa	May 2021	Portland Community College	Portland, Oregon	OR	Active	
Eta Lambda	2021	Metropolitan State University	Minneapolis, Minnesota	MN		
Eta Mu	2021	Hartwick College	Oneonta, New York	NY	Active	
Eta Nu	2021	Stonehill College	Easton, Massachusetts	MA		
Eta Xi	2021	Menlo College	Atherton, California	CA		
Eta Omicron	2021	Marquette University	Milwaukee, Wisconsin	WI		
Eta Pi	2021	Daemen University	Amherst, New York	NY		
Eta Rho	2022	Clovis Community College	Fresno, California	CA		
Eta Sigma	2022	SUNY Erie	Erie County, Pennsylvania	NY		
Eta Tau	2022	Bucks County Community College	Bucks County, Pennsylvania	PA		
Eta Upsilon	2022	Moberly Area Community College - Columbia	Columbia, Missouri	MO		
Eta Phi	2022	Northern Essex Community College	Essex County, Massachusetts	MA		
Eta Chi	2022	Central Piedmont Community College	Charlotte, North Carolina	NC		
Eta Psi	2022	King's College	Wilkes-Barre, Pennsylvania	PA		
Eta Omega	2022	Florida State University Panama City	Panama City, Florida	FL		
Theta Alpha	2022	Salve Regina University	Newport, Rhode Island	RI		
Theta Beta	2022	University of California, Santa Barbara	Santa Barbara, California	CA		
Theta Gamma	2022	York College of Pennsylvania	Spring Garden Township, Pennsylvania	PA	Active	
Theta Delta	2022	Johns Hopkins University	Baltimore, Maryland	MD	Active	
Theta Epsilon	2022	University of North Carolina Wilmington	Wilmington, North Carolina	NC	Active	
Theta Zeta	2022	Florida SouthWestern State College	Fort Myers, Florida	FL	Active	
Theta Eta	2022	Yale University	New Haven, Connecticut	CT	Active	
Theta Theta	2022	Massachusetts Bay Community College	Wellesley, Massachusetts	MA	Active	
Theta Iota	2022	Coastal Carolina University	Conway, South Carolina	SC	Active	
Theta Kappa	2023	Wake Forest University	Winston-Salem, North Carolina	NC	Active	
Theta Lambda	2023	Colby College	Waterville, Maine	ME		
Theta Mu	2023	Frostburg State University	Frostburg, Maryland	MD		
Theta Nu	2023	Auburn University	Auburn, Alabama	AL		
Theta Xi	2023	Marywood University	Scranton, Pennsylvania	PA	Active	
Theta Omicron	2023	Ocean County College	Ocean County, New Jersey	NJ	Active	
Theta Pi	2023	Fordham University	New York City, New York	NY		
Theta Rho	2023	San Diego Mesa College	San Diego, California	CA		
Theta Sigma	2023	Seton Hall University	South Orange, New Jersey	NJ		
Theta Tau	2023	Methodist University	Fayetteville, North Carolina	NC	Active	
Theta Upsilon	2023	Baylor University	Waco, Texas	TX		
Theta Phi	2023	North Carolina A&T State University	Greensboro, North Carolina	NC		
Theta Chi	2023	Guttman Community College	New York City, New York	NY	Active	
Theta Psi	2023	Maryland Institute College of Art	Baltimore, Maryland	MD		
Theta Omega	2023	University of Houston	Houston, Texas	TX		
Iota Alpha	2023	Johns Hopkins School of Nursing	Baltimore, Maryland	MD	Active	
Iota Beta	2023	Mercy University	Dobbs Ferry, New York	NY		
Iota Gamma	2023	Pepperdine University Seaver College	Malibu, California	CA	Active	
Iota Delta	2023	Schreiner University	Kerrville, Texas	TX		
Iota Epsilon	2023	Virginia Commonwealth University	Richmond, Virginia	VA		
Iota Zeta	2023	Keuka College	Keuka Park, New York	NY		
Iota Eta	2023	Cedar Crest College	Allentown, Pennsylvania	PA		
Iota Theta	2023	Western New England University	Springfield, Massachusetts	MA	Active	
Iota Iota	2023	Willamette University	Salem, Oregon	OR		
Iota Kappa	2024	Sacred Heart University	Fairfield, Connecticut	CT	Active	
Iota Lambda	2024	Loyola University Chicago	Chicago, Illinois	IL	Active	
Iota Mu	March 2024	Delaware Valley University	Doylestown, Pennsylvania	PA	Active	
Iota Nu	2024	Jefferson State Community College	Birmingham, Alabama	AL	Active	
Iota Xi	2024	University of Tennessee Southern	Pulaski, Tennessee	TN	Active	
Iota Omicron	2024	Bowie State University	Bowie, Maryland	MD		
Iota Pi	2024	Union College	Union County, New Jersey	NJ		
Iota Rho	2024	Villanova University	Villanova, Pennsylvania	PA		
Iota Sigma	September 4, 2024	Black Hawk College Quad City Campus	Moline, Illinois	IL	Active	
Iota Tau	September 4, 2024	Black Hawk College East Campus	Galva, Illinois	IL	Active	
Iota Upsilon	2024	Mount Saint Mary College	Newburgh, New York	NY		
