= Kathryn Rucker de Quelin =

American editor (1877–1970)

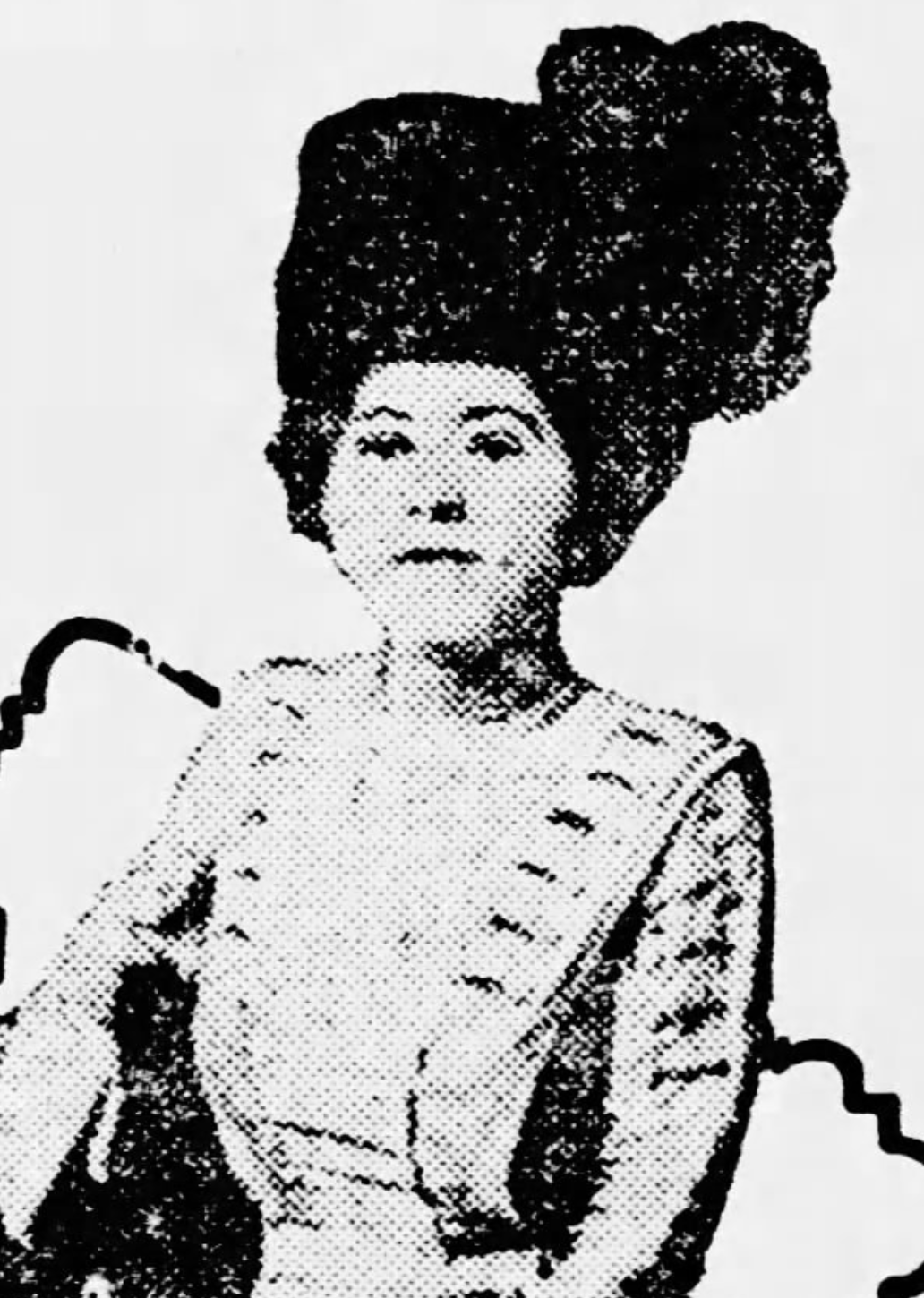
- Kathryn May Rucker, from a 1911 publication
- Born: May 21, 1877; Somerset, Kentucky, U.S.
- Died: September 22, 1970 (aged 93) New York City, U.S.
- Other names: Kathryn May Rucker, Katherine de Quelin, Catherine Dequelin
- Occupation(s): Editor, journalist, educator
- Known for: Co-founder of Japan Magazine (1910)

Kathryn May Rucker de Quelin (May 21, 1877 – September 22, 1970) was an American editor, journalist, and educator. She was co-founder and editor of Japan Magazine in 1910, and wrote many articles on art for the Columbia Encyclopedia in the 1930s.

== Early life and education ==
Rucker was from Somerset, Kentucky, the daughter of Joseph Barnett Rucker and Annie E. Hamilton Rucker. Her father was a Confederate States Army veteran, a temperance activist and a newspaper editor. Her father was murdered in 1892. She moved to Los Angeles as a young woman, and became interested in art.

== Career ==
Rucker wrote art reviews for the Los Angeles Herald in 1908 and 1909. She taught stencilling at the YWCA, and organized a 1908 exhibit of stenciled fabrics in Los Angeles.

Rucker moved to Japan to teach English in Kyoto, and study art. She became editor of Japan Magazine when it launched and was based in Tokyo as the main editor from 1910 to 1912. In 1911 she was elected a member of the Asiatic Society of Japan.

She returned to the United States in 1913, married an artist, and moved to New York City. She spoke to the Women's Press Club of Pittsburgh in 1916, about the difficulties of proofreading an English-language magazine in Japan. She continued writing about art topics. She contributed many articles to the Columbia Encyclopedia in the 1930s.

== Publications ==
In addition to her arts journalism in the Los Angeles Herald and her encyclopedia articles, Rucker wrote articles for magazines Art & Decoration and Art & Life.

- "Some Miniatures by Mabel Welch" (1913)
- "The Present Popularity of Ceramic Art: With Particular Reference to the Work of Dorothea Warren O'Hara" (1913)
- "Costume as an Expression of Ideals" (1920)
- "Period Costumes and Their Recurring Influence" (1920)

== Personal life ==
Rucker married French artist Rene Théophile de Quélin in 1913. Her husband died in 1932. In 1940 she was living in Cornwall, Connecticut. She died in 1970, at the age of 93, in New York City.
