= Master Musicians Festival =

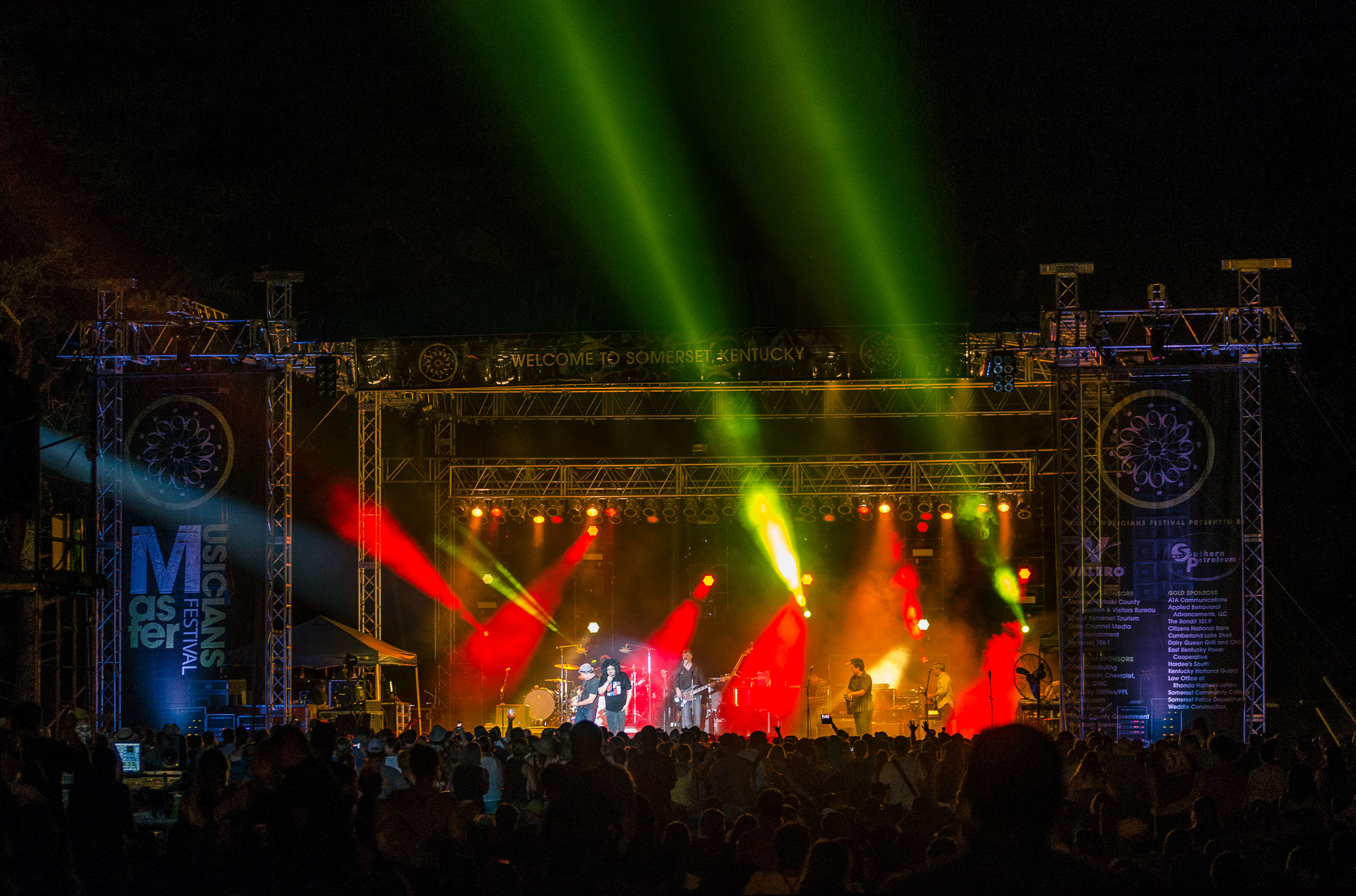
- Counting Crows on stage at the 2014 MMF.
- Genre: Varied: Rock, Folk, Jazz, Blues, Country, World, Bluegrass
- Dates: Annually in July
- Locations: Somerset Community College; Somerset, Kentucky
- Years active: 1994–2019, 2021–
- Website: mastermusiciansfestival.org

The Master Musicians Festival is an outdoor two-day music festival held annually in July in Somerset, Kentucky. Established in 1994, the event is organized by an all-volunteer board of directors on the campus of Somerset Community College. The festival is a 501(c)(3) non-profit organization with a mission of bringing musical excellence to rural Kentucky, and is funded through grants, donations, sponsorships and ticket sales.

The Master Musicians Festival showcases a wide variety of genres, from blues to bluegrass, rock to jazz, world to country, and everything in between. In 2018, to celebrate its milestone 25th anniversary, the festival welcomed a beloved singer-songwriter with Kentucky roots as its headliner — two-time Grammy winner John Prine.

Past headliners have included Counting Crows, Willie Nelson, Nickel Creek, St. Paul and The Broken Bones, Richie Havens, Dawes, Dwight Yoakam and many more. Festival organizers make an effort to feature local, Kentucky artists along with nationally known musicians.

Every year, a local visual artist is selected to create artwork that is featured on that year's festival T-shirt and is auctioned at the event to raise money for the festival. The board presents an Educator of the Year Award annually to a regional music teacher who promotes music to youth in Kentucky. An MMF Lifetime Achievement Award is also presented to a local individual who has made significant contributions to the arts. The festival incorporates regional arts displays and vendors, as well as workshops and activities for all ages.

Attendance in recent years has averaged around 6,000 over both days of the event.

== Mission statement ==
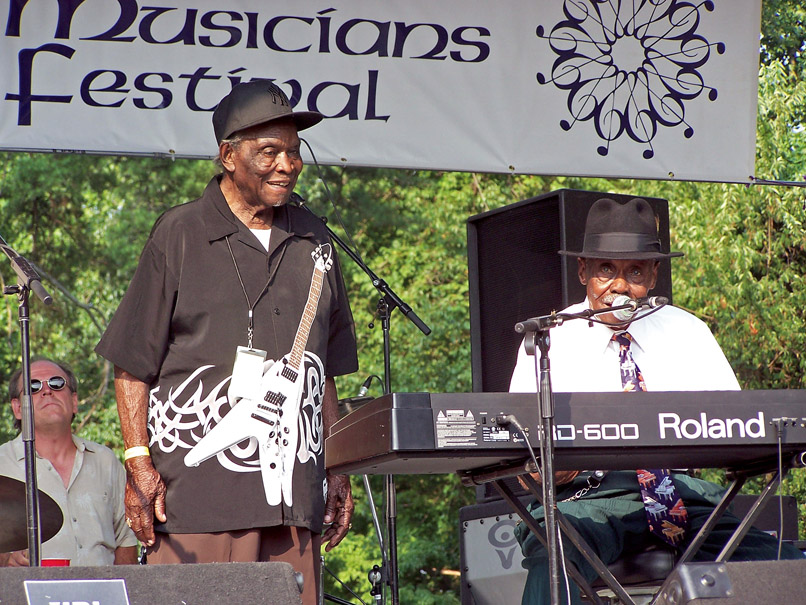
David "Honeyboy" Edwards and Pinetop Perkins at the Master Musicians Festival, July 19, 2008

Master Musicians Festival is formed for the following purposes:

- To bring multi-generational, multi-cultural programming to the Lake Cumberland and southeastern Kentucky region;
- To educate this area of Kentucky on musical arts;
- To promote performing arts, visual arts, arts and crafts, and musical and art education;
- To pay special tribute to a 'master' musician(s), educators and community members as designated from time to time by the Board of Trustees.

== History ==
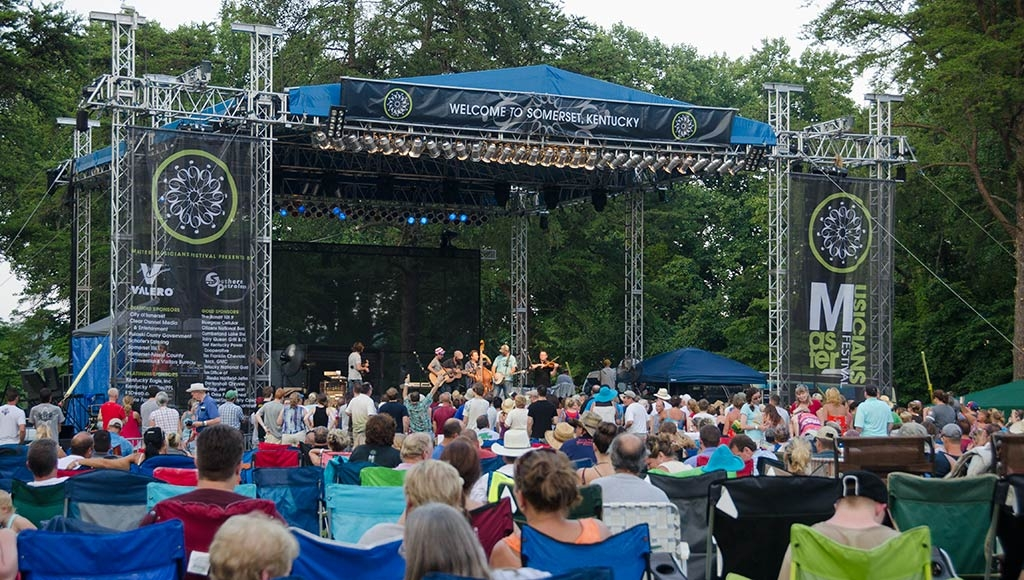
2014 daytime performance at the Master Musicians Festival on the campus of Somerset Community College in Somerset, Kentucky.

The festival was founded in 1994 by musician Gabrielle Gray, who went on to become the executive director of the International Bluegrass Music Museum and producer/director of ROMP Fest.

2020 saw the MMF go on a one-year hiatus. The Festival helped organize virtual events during the COVID-19 pandemic, and returned with a live event in 2021.

== Awards and recognition ==
- The Southeast Tourism Society named the Master Musicians Festival "Event or Festival of the Year" in 2013 for events hosting under 100,000 people.
- The Kentucky Travel Industry Association selected the 2015 Master Musicians Festival one of its 2015 Summer Top Festivals & Events.
- First place: Music Festival 2015, selected by Kentucky Living Magazine.
- MMF has been the recipient of the Kentucky Governor's Awards for the Arts as an Outstanding Community Arts Organization.
