= Center for Rural Development =

American nonprofit organization

- The 45 counties in the Center for Rural Development's service area
- Formation: March 1996; 30 years ago
- Type: 501(c)(3) nonprofit organization
- Headquarters: Somerset, Kentucky
- Location: United States
- Region served: 45 counties in Southern Kentucky and Eastern Kentucky
- Website: https://centertech.com/

The Center for Rural Development in Somerset, Kentucky, was established in March 1996. It is a 501(c)(3) nonprofit organization.

The center's goal is to promote innovative, sustainable economic development and improve quality of life for the people it serves. The center's programs and services focus on the areas of public safety, arts and culture, leadership, and technology.

== History ==
The center was established in Somerset, Kentucky, in March 1996, and became a 501(c)(3) nonprofit organization. It was the idea of U.S. Congressman from Kentucky Hal Rogers. At the outset it was viewed as a partnership between the state and the University of Kentucky, and it was supported by state and federal funds.

Due to the COVID-19 pandemic, the center held its programming virtually in 2020. In October 2020, the center was awarded over $400,000 in grant funding by the Appalachian Regional Commission. In February 2021, it received a $440,400 PPP loan.

== Programs ==
The center's programs serve residents in a 45-county area in Southern Kentucky and Eastern Kentucky.

It has a 100,000 square foot meeting and convention facility. The Somerset-Pulaski County Chamber of Commerce meets at the center.

It provides free youth leadership programs for middle school and high school students. Rogers Scholars, a one-week summer camp that had been attended by 1,100 high school students by 2017, is a partnership with 19 colleges and universities. It provides scholarship to students who meet certain academic requirements. The Union College in Barbourville, Kentucky, offers a $1,000 scholarship to all "Rogers Explorers" who attend camp at their location. The "Entrepreneurial Leadership Institute" (ELI) provides instruction to high school students in how to initiate and manage a business venture. The students who win the ELI's Business Concept Competition earn a $16,000 scholarship to Eastern Kentucky University, in Richmond, Kentucky.

The center's "Displaced Coal Miner Training" program provides technical skills training in 15 career fields for displaced coal miners and former coal employees who were adversely impacted by the region's declining coal industry.
