= WJQQ =

- Somerset, Kentucky; United States
- Frequency: 97.1 MHz
- Branding: Double Q 97.1

Programming
- Format: Classic rock
- Affiliations: Premiere Networks

Ownership
- Owner: iHeartMedia, Inc.; (iHM Licenses, LLC)
- Sister stations: WLLK-FM, WSEK, WSEK-FM, WSFC

History
- First air date: September 1, 1964 (as WSFC-FM at 96.7)
- Former call signs: WSFC-FM (1964–1968); WSEK (1968–2005); WKEQ-FM (2005); WKEQ (2005–2016)
- Former frequencies: 96.7 MHz (1964–1993)

Technical information
- Licensing authority: FCC
- Facility ID: 21624
- Class: C2
- ERP: 27,500 watts
- HAAT: 201 meters (659 ft)
- Transmitter coordinates: 36°57′40″N 84°34′07″W

Links
- Public license information: Public file; LMS
- Webcast: Listen Live
- Website: 971doubleq.iheart.com

WJQQ (97.1 FM) is a radio station broadcasting a classic rock format. Licensed to Somerset, Kentucky, United States, the station is currently owned by iHeartMedia, Inc. and features programming from Premiere Networks.

== History ==
The station went on the air as WSFC-FM on September 1, 1964. In 1966, the station was relaunched as WSEK-FM with a Western and country music format.

In 1981, WSEK-FM switched its network affiliation to the NBC Radio Network after having been with ABC since 1969.

In 1968, the station changed its call sign to WSEK. On August 9, 2005, the station changed its call sign to WKEQ-FM; on August 18, 2005, the station modified its call sign to WKEQ.

On June 1, 2016, changed its call sign to the current WJQQ, strengthening its ties to sister station WKQQ (100.1 FM) in Lexington, Kentucky.

== Previous logo ==
(WKEQ's logo under previous classic hits format)
