= WLLK-FM =

- Somerset, Kentucky; United States
- Broadcast area: Somerset, Kentucky
- Frequency: 102.3 MHz
- Branding: Lake 102.3

Programming
- Format: Hot adult contemporary
- Affiliations: Premiere Networks

Ownership
- Owner: iHeartMedia, Inc.; (iHM Licenses, LLC)
- Sister stations: WJQQ, WSEK, WSEK-FM, WSFC

History
- First air date: June 13, 1988 (as WLLK)
- Former call signs: WLLK (1988–2001); WKII-FM (2001–2004); WHMJ-FM (2004–2005)

Technical information
- Licensing authority: FCC
- Facility ID: 72780
- Class: A
- ERP: 6,000 watts
- HAAT: 100 meters
- Transmitter coordinates: 37°4′41″N 84°40′39″W

Links
- Public license information: Public file; LMS
- Webcast: Listen Live
- Website: lake1023.iheart.com

WLLK-FM (102.3 MHz) is a radio station licensed to Somerset, Kentucky, United States. The station is currently owned by iHeartMedia, Inc.

== History ==
The station went on the air as WLLK on June 13, 1988, owned by Walt Williams. In summer 1999, Williams sold the station to First Radio, owners of WKEQ (910 AM; now WSEK) WSFC (1230 AM), WSEK (96.7 FM; now WJQQ), and WWZB (93.9 FM; now WSEK-FM).

On April 10, 2001, the station changed its call sign to WKII-FM; it changed to WHMJ-FM on March 15, 2004, and to WLLK-FM on August 18, 2005.
