= WSFC (AM) =

- Somerset, Kentucky; United States
- Frequency: 1240 kHz
- Branding: News Talk 1240 WSFC

Programming
- Format: News/talk
- Affiliations: ABC News Radio; Compass Media Networks; Kentucky Sports Radio; Premiere Networks; Westwood One

Ownership
- Owner: iHeartMedia; (iHM Licenses, LLC)
- Sister stations: WSEK, WSEK-FM, WJQQ, WLLK-FM

History
- First air date: December 14, 1947; 78 years ago

Technical information
- Licensing authority: FCC
- Facility ID: 21626
- Class: C
- Power: 790 watts unlimited
- Transmitter coordinates: 37°7′3″N 84°36′42″W

Links
- Public license information: Public file; LMS
- Webcast: Listen Live
- Website: wsfcam.iheart.com

WSFC (1240 kHz) is a commercial AM radio station broadcasting a news/talk format. Licensed to Somerset, Kentucky, United States, the station is currently owned by iHeart Media as part of a duopoly of five radio stations, along with Classic country station WSEK (910 AM), country station WSEK-FM (93.9 FM, classic rock station WJQQ (97.1 FM), and Top 40/CHR station WLLK-FM (102.3 FM). WSFC maintains studios with its sister stations, along with transmission facilities, on 1st Radio Lane in the northern part of town. WSFC features programming from Compass Media Networks and Premiere Networks, and Westwood One.

== History ==
WSFC began broadcasting at 2:35 p.m. Central Time on December 14, 1947. On September 1, 1948, it became an affiliate of the Mutual network. The station was owned by Southeastern Broadcasting Company, Incorporated and broadcast on 1240 kHz with 250 watts of power. An FM counterpart, WSFC-FM (now WSEK-FM) was signed-on in 1964.

Over the course of its history, WSFC has changed hands numerous times. The station was launched by a group of local businessman. WSFC was sold to former congressman Wendell H. Meade before being acquired by then-general manager Mike Layman in 1950. Fifteen years later, the WSFC stations were sold to Swartz Media, a division of the Roanoke Photo Finishing Company. In turn, WSFC and WSEK-FM were transferred to Shamrock Communications in 1974. In 1980, they were sold again, this time to First Radio. Two years later, the station became the first Kentucky-based NBC radio affiliate to receive that network's programming by means of satellite as it joined that network.

In 2001, WSFC and its sister stations were sold to Clear Channel Communications. In November 2006, Clear Channel announced that it would place its Somerset cluster up for sale. The following May, Clear Channel announced a buyer in Pittsburgh, Pennsylvania-based GoodRadio.TV. However, the deal fell through due to financial difficulties, and the stations remain owned by now-iHeartMedia.

In June 2016, WSFC flipped from Fox Sports-affiliated sports radio to its current News Talk Information format, inheriting it from WSFE (910 AM; now WSEK.

== Programming ==
As of July 2022, WSFC does not provide any locally based talk programming. Its present lineup consists of syndicated programs This Morning, The Clay Travis and Buck Sexton Show, The Sean Hannity Show, Glenn Beck Radio Program, The Mark Levin Show, and Coast to Coast AM. Additionally, the station syndicated Kentucky Sports Radio programming from sister station and KSR flagship WLAP in Lexington, Kentucky. WSFC serves as the local affiliate of the UK Sports Network.

The station's broadcasts of worship services by the First Baptist Church, which began in 1948, is currently the longest-running church worship broadcast in Kentucky.
