= Somerset Downtown Commercial District =

Historic district in Kentucky, United States

- U.S. National Register of Historic Places
- U.S. Historic district
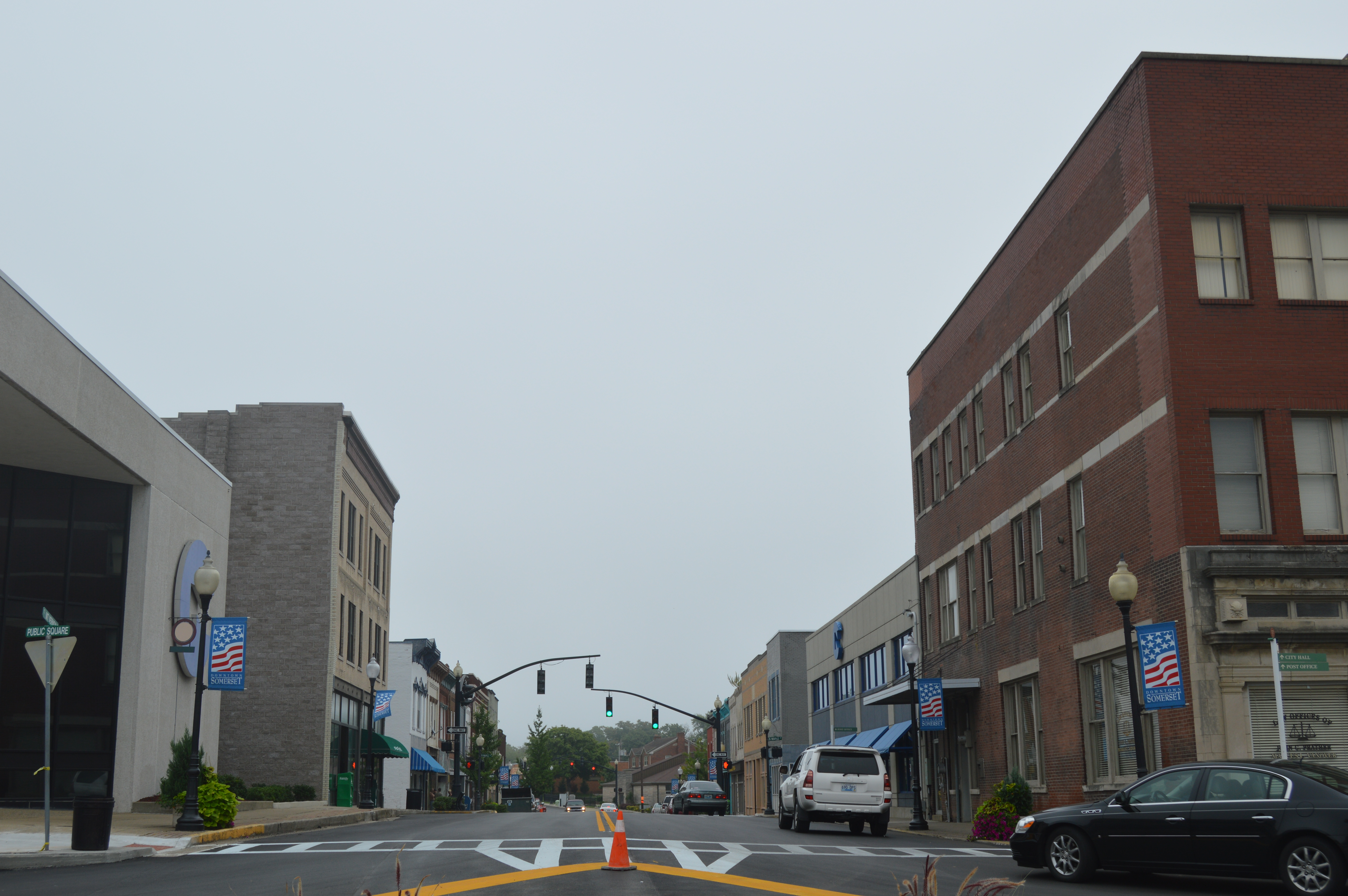

- Location within Kentucky Location within the United States
- Location: 108-236 and 201-223 E. Mt. Vernon St., Somerset, Kentucky
- Coordinates: 37°05′32″N 84°36′15″W
- Area: 1.9 acres (0.77 ha)
- Built: 1880
- Architectural style: Late Victorian
- NRHP reference No.: 82002742
- Added to NRHP: August 27, 1982

The Somerset Downtown Commercial District in Somerset, Kentucky, which includes 108-236 and 201-223 E. Mt. Vernon St., is a 1.9 acres (0.77 ha) historic district which was listed on the National Register of Historic Places in 1982. The district included 15 contributing buildings.

It was asserted to be "the last remaining concentration of late 19th and early 20th century commercial buildings in south central Kentucky" and "the largest such district in Pulaski County."
