= Somerset, Kentucky =

- City
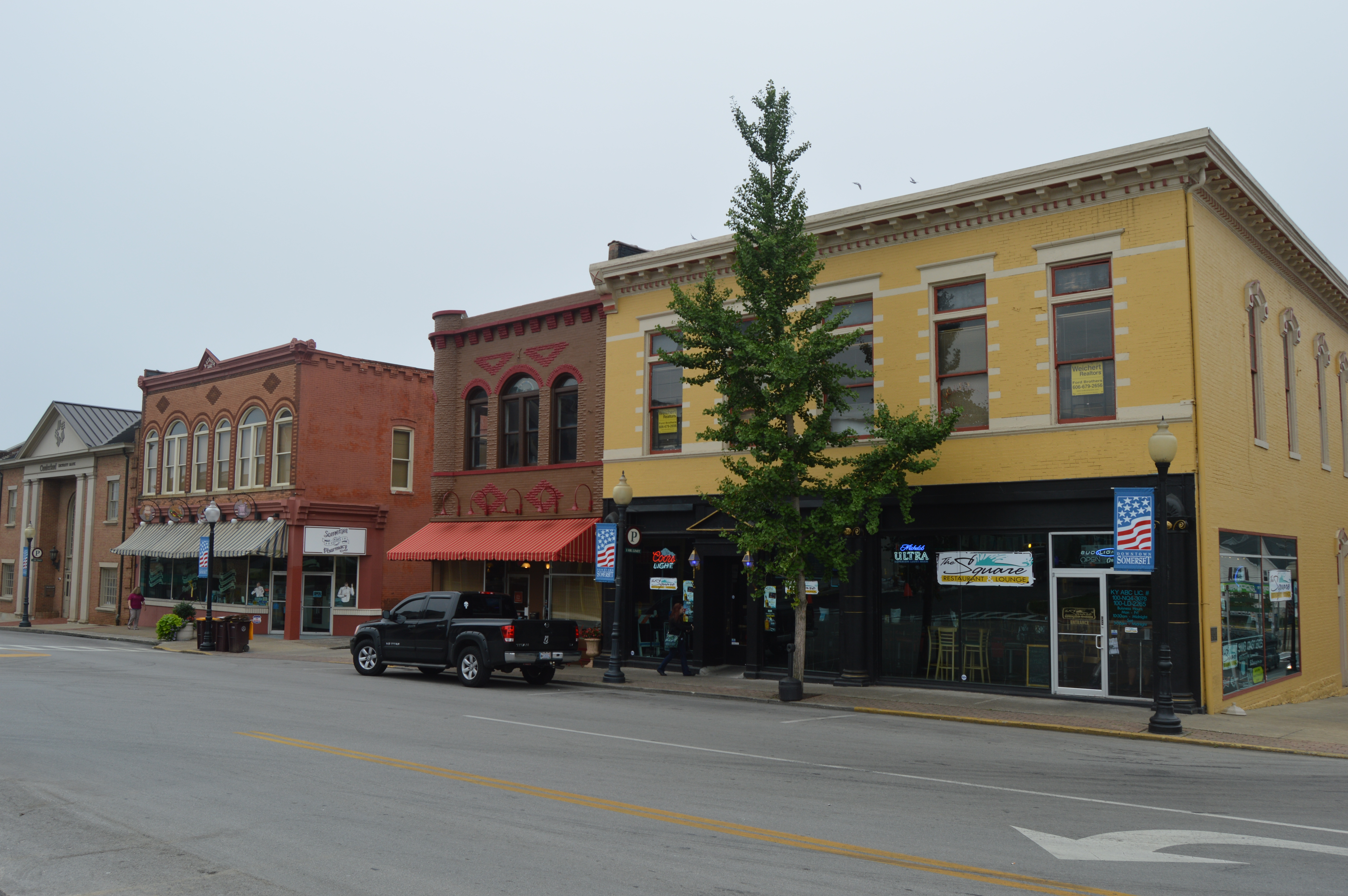
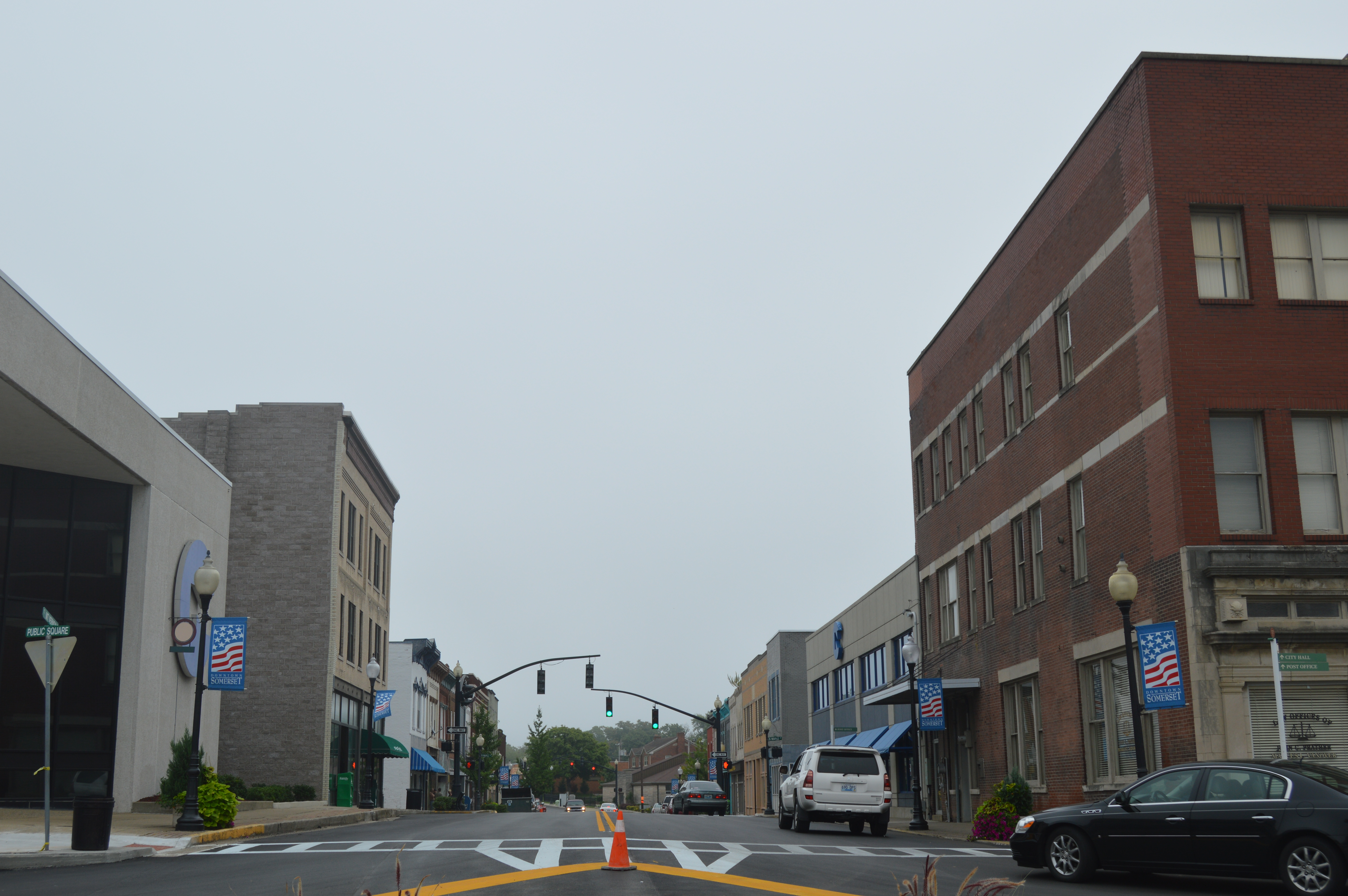
- Corner of Main Street and West Mt. Vernon Street, featuring the historic Goldenberg Furniture building (2014) Somerset Downtown Commercial District

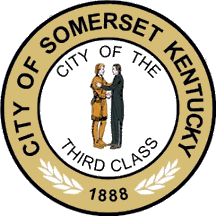
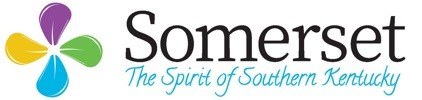
- Seal Logo
- Nickname: Car Cruise Capital of Kentucky
- Motto: The Spirit of Southern Kentucky
- Location within Pulaski County and Kentucky
- Coordinates: 37°05′04″N 84°36′29″W
- Country: United States
- State: Kentucky
- County: Pulaski
- Founded: 1798
- Incorporated: 1887
- Named for: Somerset County, New Jersey

Government
  - Mayor: Alan Keck (R)

Area
  - City: 14.09 sq mi (36.48 km^{2})
  - Land: 14.07 sq mi (36.44 km^{2})
  - Water: 0.019 sq mi (0.05 km^{2})
- Elevation: 860 ft (260 m)

Population (2020)
  - City: 11,924
  - Estimate (2025): 12,695
  - Density: 847.5/sq mi (327.2/km^{2})
  - Metro: 67,384
- Time zone: UTC−5 (Eastern (EST))
  - Summer (DST): UTC−4 (EDT)
- ZIP Code: 42501 to 42503
- Area code: 606
- FIPS code: 21-71688
- GNIS ID: 2405483
- Website: cityofsomerset.com

Somerset is a home rule-class city in and the county seat of Pulaski County, Kentucky, United States. As of the 2020 census, its population was 11,924. Somerset's micropolitan area population is 67,384; it comprises the entirety of Pulaski County.

== History ==
Somerset was first settled in 1798 by Thomas Hansford and received its name from Somerset County, New Jersey, where some of the early settlers had formerly lived. Somerset became the Pulaski County seat in 1801, and was incorporated as a city in 1887. The Civil War Battle of Mill Springs was fought in January 1862 at Logan's Crossroads (now "Nancy") about 8 miles (13 km) west of Somerset, and a museum is at the site. A smaller battle was fought nearby at Dutton's Hill in 1863. In 1875 tracks for the Southern Railway were completed and Somerset saw a population growth and an increase in industry. In the late 1930s and early 1940s, library services were provided by the pack horse library. The completion of Lake Cumberland in 1950 transformed Somerset from a sleepy rural community into a recreation center.

The Center for Rural Development in Somerset was established in 1996. It is a 501c(3) nonprofit organization that describes its mission as follows: "to provide leadership that stimulates innovative and sustainable economic development solutions and a better way of life for the citizens we serve." The center's programs and services focus on public safety, arts & culture, leadership, and technology.

=== 2025 tornado ===
One person was killed in Somerset and 17 in the neighboring city of London on the evening of May 16, 2025, when an EF4 tornado caused significant damage in the area. A mass casualty incident was declared for Somerset, which sustained EF2-EF3 damage. In all, the tornado killed 19 and injured at least 108 others.

=== General Lee Jump ===
For Somernites Cruise's 25th Anniversary, on June 28, 2025, Northeast Ohio Dukes jumped a replica Dukes of Hazzard car over Somerset's Fountain Square, attracting over 35,000 spectators and bringing international attention to the town.

== Geography ==
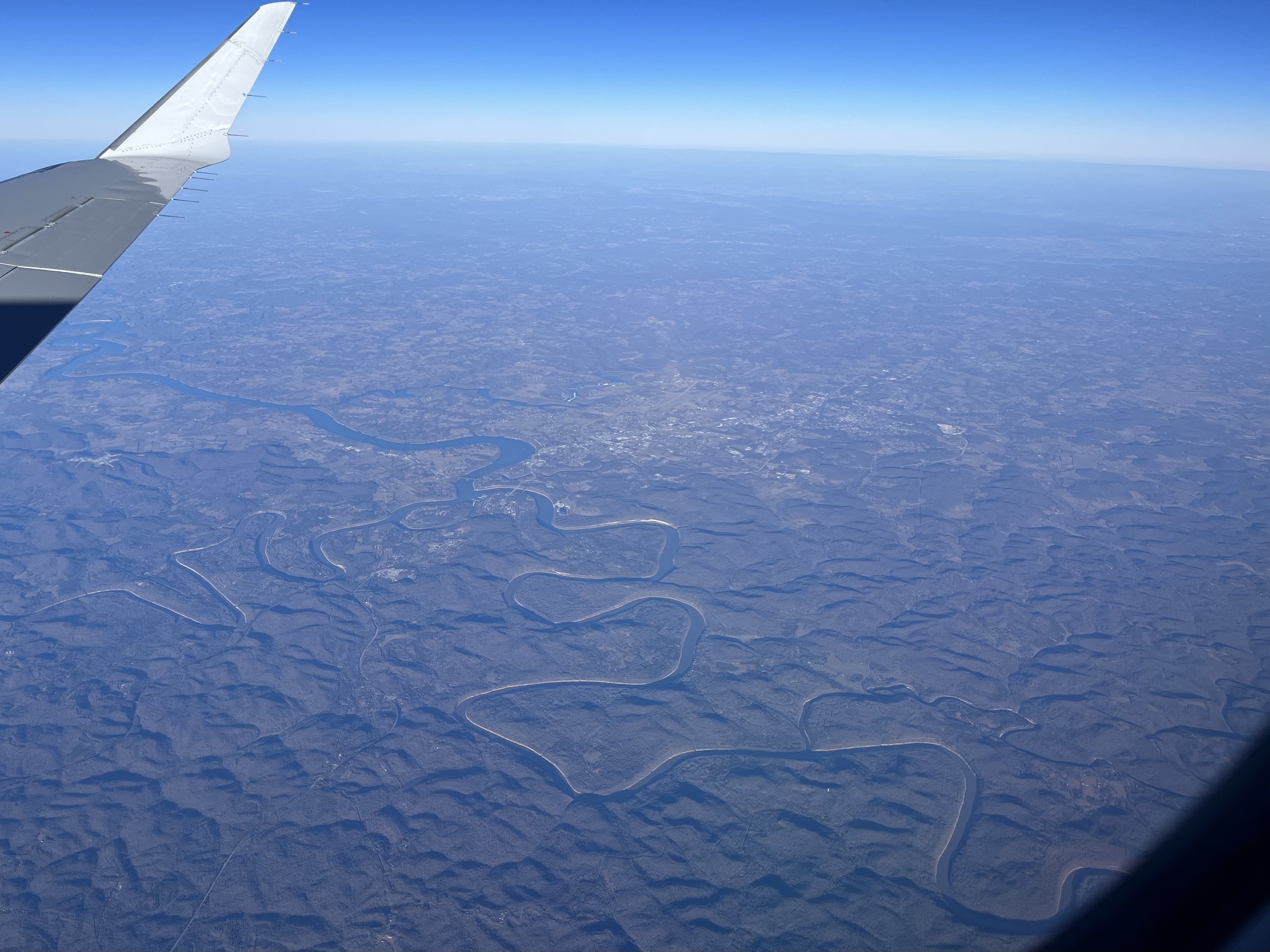
Aerial view in 2024

The city is located at the eastern end of Kentucky's Mississippian Plateau (or Pennyroyal Plateau); however, the micropolitan area extends eastward into the Appalachian Plateau (or Eastern Kentucky Coalfield), and northward to Kentucky's Outer Bluegrass region. Thus, the area shows variations in landforms and scenery.

Nearby Lake Cumberland is one of the largest man-made lakes in the world (101 miles in length, with an average depth of 85 feet (26 m) and a normal pool containing more than 2 trillion gallons of water). Somerset is also near Cumberland Falls and the Big South Fork National River and Recreation Area; its tourism industries are, in part, due to its scenic and varied landscape.

According to the United States Census Bureau, the city has a total area of 11.3 square miles (29 km^{2}), of which 0.09% is covered by water.

=== Climate ===
The climate in this area is characterized by hot, humid summers and generally mild to cool winters. According to the Köppen climate classification, Somerset has a humid subtropical climate, Cfa on climate maps.

Somerset's climate is warm during summer when temperatures tend to be in the 80s and mild during winter when temperatures tend to be in the 30s and 40s. The warmest month of the year is July with an average daily maximum temperature of 86.5 °F (30.3 °C). The coldest month of the year is January with an average minimum temperature of 29.0 °F (−1.7 °C).

The annual average precipitation at Somerset is 53.28 inches (1,353 mm). Rainfall is fairly evenly distributed throughout the year. The wettest month of the year is July with an average rainfall of 5.28 inches (134 mm). Snowfall typically occurs between the months of December and February, though on record as early as October and as late as May.

Climate data for Somerset, Kentucky (1991–2020 normals, extremes 1950–2020)
Month	Jan	Feb	Mar	Apr	May	Jun	Jul	Aug	Sep	Oct	Nov	Dec	Year
Record high °F (°C)	77 (25)	79 (26)	84 (29)	89 (32)	92 (33)	103 (39)	103 (39)	104 (40)	101 (38)	96 (36)	84 (29)	75 (24)	104 (40)
Mean maximum °F (°C)	64.8 (18.2)	68.2 (20.1)	75.1 (23.9)	82.4 (28.0)	86.6 (30.3)	91.3 (32.9)	93.3 (34.1)	92.6 (33.7)	89.9 (32.2)	83.2 (28.4)	74.5 (23.6)	66.1 (18.9)	94.4 (34.7)
Mean daily maximum °F (°C)	45.4 (7.4)	49.7 (9.8)	58.5 (14.7)	69.8 (21.0)	76.7 (24.8)	83.7 (28.7)	86.5 (30.3)	86.0 (30.0)	80.7 (27.1)	70.9 (21.6)	58.5 (14.7)	48.8 (9.3)	67.9 (19.9)
Daily mean °F (°C)	37.2 (2.9)	40.6 (4.8)	48.5 (9.2)	58.9 (14.9)	66.7 (19.3)	74.2 (23.4)	77.7 (25.4)	76.5 (24.7)	70.3 (21.3)	59.4 (15.2)	48.4 (9.1)	40.9 (4.9)	58.3 (14.6)
Mean daily minimum °F (°C)	29.0 (−1.7)	31.6 (−0.2)	38.6 (3.7)	48.1 (8.9)	56.6 (13.7)	64.8 (18.2)	69.0 (20.6)	67.1 (19.5)	60.0 (15.6)	47.9 (8.8)	38.3 (3.5)	33.0 (0.6)	48.7 (9.3)
Mean minimum °F (°C)	4.6 (−15.2)	10.5 (−11.9)	16.2 (−8.8)	27.6 (−2.4)	38.0 (3.3)	49.1 (9.5)	56.7 (13.7)	54.3 (12.4)	42.5 (5.8)	29.8 (−1.2)	19.7 (−6.8)	13.4 (−10.3)	1.3 (−17.1)
Record low °F (°C)	−32 (−36)	−17 (−27)	−4 (−20)	18 (−8)	26 (−3)	34 (1)	44 (7)	41 (5)	30 (−1)	17 (−8)	−2 (−19)	−17 (−27)	−32 (−36)
Average precipitation inches (mm)	4.33 (110)	3.93 (100)	5.11 (130)	4.93 (125)	5.22 (133)	5.00 (127)	5.28 (134)	3.94 (100)	3.71 (94)	3.19 (81)	3.77 (96)	4.87 (124)	53.28 (1,353)
Average snowfall inches (cm)	3.0 (7.6)	1.3 (3.3)	0.8 (2.0)	0.0 (0.0)	0.0 (0.0)	0.0 (0.0)	0.0 (0.0)	0.0 (0.0)	0.0 (0.0)	0.0 (0.0)	0.0 (0.0)	0.3 (0.76)	5.4 (14)
Average precipitation days (≥ 0.01 in)	12.4	10.8	12.5	12.3	12.4	11.3	11.1	9.4	8.9	8.2	9.5	12.9	131.7
Average snowy days (≥ 0.1 in)	1.6	1.5	0.8	0.0	0.0	0.0	0.0	0.0	0.0	0.0	0.2	0.6	4.7
Source: NOAA

== Demographics ==
Historical population
Census	Pop.	Note	%±
1830	231		—
1850	412		—
1860	662		60.7%
1870	587		−11.3%
1880	805		37.1%
1890	2,625		226.1%
1900	3,384		28.9%
1910	4,491		32.7%
1920	4,072		−9.3%
1930	5,508		35.3%
1940	6,154		11.7%
1950	7,097		15.3%
1960	7,112		0.2%
1970	10,436		46.7%
1980	10,649		2.0%
1990	10,733		0.8%
2000	11,352		5.8%
2010	11,196		−1.4%
2020	11,924		6.5%
2025 (est.)	12,695		6.5%
U.S. Decennial Census

The major demographic differences between the city and the micropolitan area relate to income, housing composition, and age. The micropolitan area, as compared to the incorporated city, is more suburban in flavor and has a younger housing stock and a higher income, and contains most of the area's school-age population. Over the last 20 years, housing growth has occurred along the Fishing Creek tributary of Lake Cumberland, which lies just to the west of the City of Somerset, and along the main body of Lake Cumberland between the City of Burnside and Fishing Creek. Much of the Somerset area housing growth in the last 20 years is lake oriented.

=== 2020 census ===
As of the 2020 census, Somerset had a population of 11,924. The median age was 42.5 years. 19.8% of residents were under the age of 18 and 21.6% of residents were 65 years of age or older. For every 100 females there were 89.1 males, and for every 100 females age 18 and over there were 83.1 males age 18 and over.

99.5% of residents lived in urban areas, while 0.5% lived in rural areas.

There were 4,979 households in Somerset, of which 27.2% had children under the age of 18 living in them. Of all households, 33.1% were married-couple households, 19.4% were households with a male householder and no spouse or partner present, and 39.7% were households with a female householder and no spouse or partner present. About 38.9% of all households were made up of individuals and 17.6% had someone living alone who was 65 years of age or older.

There were 5,596 housing units, of which 11.0% were vacant. The homeowner vacancy rate was 3.1% and the rental vacancy rate was 9.3%.

Racial composition as of the 2020 census
Race	Number	Percent
White	10,556	88.5%
Black or African American	357	3.0%
American Indian and Alaska Native	51	0.4%
Asian	92	0.8%
Native Hawaiian and Other Pacific Islander	2	0.0%
Some other race	268	2.2%
Two or more races	598	5.0%
Hispanic or Latino (of any race)	543	4.6%

=== 2000 census ===
As of the census of 2000, 11,352 people, 4,831 households, and 2,845 families resided in the City of Somerset. The population density for the city was 1,007.1 persons per square mile (388.8 persons/km^{2}). A karst valley occupies the south-central portion of the city, taking up about 25% of the land area; this valley is quasi-industrialized and also contains parks and recreational facilities; most of the population lives to the east and north of this valley in fairly compact residential neighborhoods that have a real population density of about 1,800 persons per square mile. The 5,428 housing units had an average density of 481.5 per square mile (185.9/km^{2}). The racial makeup of the city was 94.16% White, 3.66% Black, 0.18% Native American, 0.71% Asian, 0.26% from other races, and 1.02% from two or more races. Hispanics or Latinos of any race were 0.99% of the population.

Of the 4,831 households, 26.6% had children under 18 living with them, 41.3% were married couples living together, 15.0% had a female householder with no husband present, and 41.1% were not families. About 37.8% of all households were made up of individuals, and 18.4% had someone living alone who was 65 or older. The average household size was 2.13 and the average family size was 2.80.

In the city, the age distribution was 20.6% under 18, 8.5% from 18 to 24, 27.8% from 25 to 44, 21.7% from 45 to 64, and 21.4% 65 or older. The median age was 40 years. For every 100 females, there were 82.5 males. For every 100 females 18 and over, there were 78.5 males.

The median income for a household in the city was $22,362, and for a family was $31,226. Males had a median income of $28,536 versus $20,194 for females. The per capita income for the city was $14,048. About 16.4% of families and 22.1% of the population were below the poverty line, including 31.3% of those under 18 and 18.9% of those 65 or over.

== Economy ==
Tourism is important to Somerset, due to its proximity to Lake Cumberland, which generated about $150 million in revenue each year as of 2013, though the industry has been greatly impacted in recent years by the U.S. Army Corps of Engineers' work on the Wolf Creek Dam. Since 2007, Lake Cumberland has been at low levels to facilitate the Corps work. The city holds the annual Master Musicians Festival. The Civil War Battle of Mill Springs took place in nearby Nancy. In November 2006, the Mill Springs Battlefield Visitor Center and Museum opened. Begun in 2001, Somernites Cruise is a monthly classic car show held the fourth weekend of the months April through October.

In 2006, a new 58-acre (230,000 m^{2}) medical park, called MedPark West, was finished near the Lake Cumberland Regional Hospital (LCRH). LCRH is one of the largest in the state. LCRH is a JCAHO-accredited hospital with 304 beds. A virtual online tour of the hospital is available. A ventilator care facility, Rockcastle Regional Hospital and Respiratory Care Center, is in adjoining Rockcastle County.

On June 26, 2012, Somerset city voters approved the sale of alcoholic beverages by a margin of 2,167 "Wet" votes to 1,464 "Dry" votes. This vote allows for packaged liquor and beer sales, and sales by the drink at restaurants and bars.

In 2014, a municipal-run filling station, the Somerset Fuel Center, was opened in response to persistently high local gas prices. "The price of gas will be based on an average regional price and will include a small markup to cover costs, the mayor said." In addition to serving local residents, it was hoped the station would encourage visits to nearby Lake Cumberland for fishing and boating.

Nearby Somerset, located off Highway 461, is the Valley Oak Technology Complex, an industrial center. Housed there are such companies as SafeAuto.

On November 21, 2025, the Somerset-Pulaski Economic Development Authority and Publix Super Markets announced that a Publix was coming to the city at U.S. 27 and Jefferson Drive.

Major employers in the Somerset area include:

- Blackboard
- Hendrickson
- Prairie Farms Dairy
- Safe Auto Insurance Company
- Texas Roadhouse

== Arts and culture ==
Somerset's arts and cultural institutions primarily serve the surrounding Lake Cumberland region, a largely rural stretch of south-central Kentucky centered around Pulaski County. Because Somerset is the largest town in the immediate area, its theaters, festivals, and art groups naturally draw crowds and performers from neighboring counties.

Somerset has several venues for live music, theater, and film. Downtown is home to The Virginia, a historic theater designed by architect George L. Elliot that first opened for silent movies in 1922. It operated for decades before a 1994 ice storm caused the roof to collapse. Following a city-led restoration, the building reopened on its 100th anniversary in 2022 and now hosts live music, comedy, films, and plays. For larger touring shows and concerts, Center for Rural Development, which opened in 1996, features a 760-seat theater inside its 100,000-square-foot facility. Flashback Theater Co., a semi-professional nonprofit founded in 2014, puts on smaller contemporary and original plays at venues around town. Somerset Community College also hosts student and community shows at its Stoner Little Theatre.

Somerset hosts several recurring festivals and public gatherings throughout the year. Founded in 1994 by musician Gabrielle Gray, the Master Musicians Festival is held each July on the Somerset Community College campus. Organized by a volunteer nonprofit board, the two-day outdoor event draws between 3,000 and 6,000 attendees for performances spanning bluegrass, rock, blues, folk, and Americana. From April through October, classic car owners and spectators gather downtown on the fourth Saturday of each month for the Somernites Cruise, a recurring car show that led the state to nickname Somerset as the "Car Cruise Capital of Kentucky". Twice a year, the city closes off downtown Fountain Square for street festivals with food trucks, live music, and local art, holding Foodstock in the spring. and the Moonlight Festival in the fall.

Visual arts and traditional Appalachian crafts are largely organized by Sheltowee Artisans Guild, a local nonprofit collective. The group organizes public art displays, sets up booths alongside the Lake Cumberland Farmers Market, and hosts juried shows featuring local pottery, woodwork, textiles, and paintings.

== Parks and recreation ==
The municipal park system is managed by Somerset Parks and Recreation Department, which centers its programs at the 38,000-square-foot Rocky Hollow Recreation Center. The facility includes fitness rooms, basketball courts, and an indoor walking track.

The city manages several public parks, recreation areas, and municipal green spaces which include:

Rocky Hollow Park: An 11-acre park near downtown that features a paved walking path, an amphitheater, a hillside disc golf course, and Fischer Fun Park 2, a wheelchair-accessible playground.

Somersport Park: A 17-acre sports complex used for local youth soccer and baseball leagues. It includes walking paths, and the original Fischer Fun Park playground.

Somerset Cemetery: A city-owned and maintained historic cemetery spanning 20-acres. The property preserves Civil War trench lines and early African American slave burial sites.

Citizens Park and Huffaker Willow Park: Citizens Park features a community picnic shelter and public horseshoe pits. Nearby Huffaker Willow Park features a playground and Pulaski County's only public dog park.

Miracle Museum: Located at the corner of Spring and Maple streets, this park features an sensory playground. Its design specifically accommodates children with physical, sensory, or socialization disabilities.

Several larger parks sit just outside the city limits near Lake Cumberland. These include Pulaski County Park, an 804-acre park that offers lakeside camping, boat ramps, and bike and hiking trails. General Burnside Island State Park is Kentucky's only island state park and features a golf course alongside a public campground.

== Government ==
Somerset operates under a mayor–council government system consisting of an elected mayor and a 12-member city council.

=== Municipal government ===
The mayor serves as the chief executive officer of the city and is elected to a four-year term in a non-partisan municipal election. Alan Keck has served as mayor since January 2019 after winning election in 2018 and re-election in 2022. Following Keck's decision not to seek a third term, former Somerset Police Chief and Community Development Director William Hunt was elected mayor in the November 3, 2026 general election to succeed him in January 2027.

The Somerset City Council has 12 members who represent individual districts but are elected at-large by voters across the city. The council approves the city's annual budget, passes local ordinances, and sets municipal policy during public meetings held on the second and fourth Mondays of each month at the Somerset Energy Center. Beyond legislative duties, the city runs its own police and fire departments, street and sanitation services, planning and zoning, and local utilities for water, wastewater, and natural gas.

=== County, state, and federal representation ===
Somerset is home to the Pulaski County Courthouse and county administrative offices. Pulaski County is run by the Pulaski County Fiscal Court, which includes and elected county judge/executive and five magistrates. In the Kentucky General Assembly, Somerset and Pulaski County are represented both the Kentucky Senate and the Kentucky House of Representatives, including House District 85.

In Congress, Somerset is part of Kentucky's 5th congressional district. The district has been represented in the United States House of Representatives by Somerset resident Hal Rogers since 1981. At the statewide level, Kentucky is represented in the U.S. Senate by Mitch McConnell and Rand Paul, with Andy Barr elected in November 2026 to succeed McConnell in January 2027.

== Education ==
=== Public K12 ===
The central portions of Somerset are within the Somerset Independent School District, while outerlying portions are instead in the Pulaski County School District. The comprehensive high schools of the county school districts are Pulaski County High School and Southwestern High School, which was built in 1993 to alleviate overcrowding. The three main high schools are Southwestern, Pulaski County, and Somerset. A single K8 independent school named Science Hill Independent School is located in Science Hill which students of Somerset can attend.

=== Private K12 ===
Other smaller schools include Tabernacle Christian Academy, Somerset Christian School, and Saline Christian Academy.

=== Post-Secondary ===
The local two-year college, Somerset Community College, is part of the Kentucky Community and Technical College System. Somerset Community College offers one of the few aviation maintenance technology programs (airframe and powerplant) in Kentucky at Lake Cumberland Regional Airport. There is also a regional campus for Campbellsville University located in Somerset.

=== Other ===
Somerset has a lending library, a branch of the Pulaski County Public Library.

== Media ==
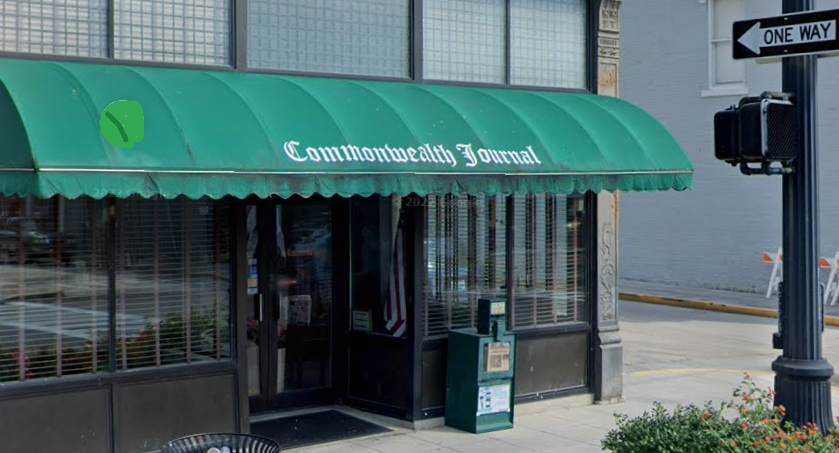
The Commonwealth Journal building

Somerset's primary newspaper is the Commonwealth Journal, a broadsheet publication owned by Community Newspaper Holdings that covers local news across Somerset and Pulaski County. The paper began in 1966, when two local weeklies - The Somerset Journal (founded in 1895) and The Commonwealth (founded in 1912) - merged into a single publication. While the Commonwealth Journal updates its website daily, its print edition is delivered twice a week on Wednesdays and Saturdays, following a schedule change in June 2026.

Somerset and Pulaski County have several local AM and FM radio stations, with most commercial stations run by IHeartMedia and Forcht Broadcasting.

=== AM stations ===
- WSEK (910 AM) - Classic country (licensed to Burnside)
- WSFC (1240 AM) - News/talk
- WTLO (1480 AM) - Adult standards

=== FM stations ===
- WKVY (88.1 FM) - Contemporary Christian music (K-Love)
- WDCL-FM (89.7 FM) - Public radio (WKU Public Radio, licensed to Western Kentucky University)
- WTHL (90.5 FM) - Religious/Christian Talk
- WSEK-FM (93.9 FM) - Country (licensed to Burnside)
- WIJS-LP (94.3 FM) - Spanish Christian
- WJQQ (97.1 FM) - Classic rock
- WLLK-FM (102.3 FM) - Contemporary hit radio/Top 40
- WYKY (106.1 FM) - Adult contemporary

=== Television ===
Because Somerset and Pulaski County sit within the Lexington television market, local viewers receive most over-the-air network programming from Lexington-based stations, including WLEX-TV (NBC), WKYT-TV (CBS), WTVQ-TV (ABC), and WDKY-TV (Fox). Public television is broadcast locally through WKSO-TV (channel 29), a Somerset-licensed transmitter for Kentucky Educational Television (KET/PBS).

== Notable people ==
- Arthur W. Allen – surgeon, medical educator, and author who served as president of the American College of Surgeons, Massachusetts Medical Society, and the Boston Medical Library
- James L. Allen – one of the founders of the management consulting firms Booz Allen Hamilton and Strategy
- Harriette Simpson Arnow – author
- Howard H. Baker – U.S. congressman for the state of Tennessee
- John Sherman Cooper – former U.S. senator, liberal Republican, and member of the Warren Commission
- Jack Daws – artist
- Kathryn Rucker de Quelin (1877–1970), American journalist, editor
- Daniel Dutton – artist, lyricist, and composer
- Bud Foster – Virginia Tech Hokies football defensive advisor/analyst
- Lance Fuller – actor
- Vermont Garrison – U.S. Air Force pilot in three wars who achieved "ace" status in both World War II and Korean War
- Jack I. Gregory – General, USAF, Commander in Chief Pacific Air Forces 1986–1988
- Reggie Hanson – former NBA player for the Boston Celtics
- Chuck Hardwick – politician and businessman, served as Speaker of the New Jersey General Assembly
- Lewis G. Longsworth – chemist, biochemist, recipient of the 1968 American Chemical Society Award in Chromatography and Electrophoresis
- Ted McCarty – electrical engineer known for his innovations and design work at the Gibson Guitar Corporation
- Monte Montague – stage and film actor
- Edwin P. Morrow – Governor of Kentucky, 1919–1923
- Tunstall Quarles – pioneer settler of Somerset, lawyer, state representative, state senator. Organized first bank in Somerset
- Lloyd B. Ramsey, (1918–2016), Major General United States Army, Commander 23rd Infantry Division (United States) (1969–1970)
- Leonard Rutherford – (1898–1951), Old-time fiddle player
- Venus Ramey – Miss America 1944
- Red Roberts – American football player and coach
- Hal Rogers, U.S. congressman, former Commonwealth's attorney for Pulaski and Rockcastle counties
- Hunter Flynn - singer
- Tommy Lee Wallace – film producer, director, and screenwriter
