= WSEK (AM) =

- Burnside, Kentucky; United States
- Broadcast area: Somerset, Kentucky
- Frequency: 910 kHz
- Branding: Icons 910

Programming
- Format: Classic country

Ownership
- Owner: iHeartMedia, Inc.; (iHM Licenses, LLC)
- Sister stations: WJQQ, WLLK-FM, WSEK-FM, WSFC

History
- First air date: 1984 (as WKEQ)
- Former call signs: WKEQ (1982–2005); WLLK (2005); WSFE (2005–2016)

Technical information
- Licensing authority: FCC
- Facility ID: 37024
- Class: D
- Power: 430 watts day 115 watts night
- Transmitter coordinates: 37°1′46.3″N 84°36′22.8″W

Links
- Public license information: Public file; LMS
- Webcast: Listen Live
- Website: icons910.iheart.com

WSEK (910 kHz) is an AM radio station broadcasting a classic country music format. Licensed to Burnside, Kentucky, United States, the station is currently owned by iHeartMedia, Inc.

== History ==
The station went on the air as WKEQ in 1984. The station was owned by a group headed by Greensburg, Kentucky native Lynn Pruitt. WKEQ launched with a country music format with studios on US 27. WKEQ launched a Top 40/CHR FM sister station as WJDJ (93.9 FM; now WSEK-FM) on August 16, 1985. In 1999, WSEK flipped to a gospel music format from the Solid Gospel network (now Singing News Radio). By 2005, the station had switched to a sports radio format.

In 2001, the First Radio conglomerate was sold to Clear Channel Communications. In November 2006, Clear Channel announced that it would place its Somerset cluster up for sale. The following May, Clear Channel announced a buyer in Pittsburgh, Pennsylvania-based GoodRadio.TV. However, the deal fell through due to financial difficulties, and the stations remain owned by now-iHeartMedia.

On August 9, 2005, the station changed its call sign to WLLK; it changed to WSFE on August 18, 2005.

On June 1, 2016, the station switched its calls to the current WSEK and began airing classic country music, pushing the News Talk Information format to WSFC.

former logo
