= WSEK-FM =

Radio station in Burnside–Somerset, Kentucky

- Burnside, Kentucky; United States
- Broadcast area: Somerset, Kentucky
- Frequency: 93.9 MHz
- Branding: K93 Country

Programming
- Format: Country music
- Affiliations: Premiere Networks

Ownership
- Owner: iHeartMedia, Inc.; (iHM Licenses, LLC)
- Sister stations: WSEK, WSFC, WJQQ, WLLK-FM

History
- First air date: August 16, 1985 (as WJDJ)
- Former call signs: WJDJ (1985–1998); WWZB (1998–2001); WLLK (2001–2005); WLLK-FM (2005); WSEK (2005–2016)
- Call sign meaning: W SomErset, Kentucky

Technical information
- Licensing authority: FCC
- Facility ID: 37027
- Class: C2
- ERP: 50,000 watts
- HAAT: 150 meters (490 ft)
- Transmitter coordinates: 37°09′15″N 84°27′35″W

Links
- Public license information: Public file; LMS
- Webcast: Listen Live
- Website: k93country.iheart.com

WSEK-FM (93.9 MHz) is a radio station broadcasting a country music format. Licensed to Burnside, Kentucky, it serves the south-central region of the state, specifically the Somerset and Lake Cumberland areas. It can also be received in London and Corbin, and as far north as the Lexington area. The station is owned by iHeartMedia, Inc. and features programming from Premiere Networks.

== History ==
The station went on the air as WJDJ on August 16, 1985, and was launched by sister AM station WKEQ (910; now WSEK), with a Top 40/CHR format with some oldies and local sports coverage blending in, and was an affiliate of NBC Radio Network's The Source network. The station quickly became the only CHR station in the area but was mixed in with local high school sports coverages as well.

Prior to the station's launch, Top 40 titles were previously played on adult contemporary station WCTT-FM in Corbin within a 35-mile radius and a strong signal, as well as a moderate signal of AC station WVLK-AM in Lexington. In 1984, Corbin received another adult contemporary station with a strong signal to the Somerset market, former MOR station WYGO-FM, which around the same time, WYGO also became affiliates with both Dan Ingram's Top 40 Satellite Survey, and Casey Kasem's (later Shadoe Stevens') American Top 40 despite being an AC station. This lasted until WYGO dropped the AC format in March 1989. This left WCTT the only AC station in the Somerset market and WJDJ the only CHR station in the Somerset market.

However, before the launch of WJDJ in 1985, Mainstream Top 40 listeners at the time were either easily directed to listen to WLAP-FM or WFMI in Lexington in the north or WOKI in Knoxville in the southeast, both of which have a radius of 60 miles. Knoxville would later have another Mainstream Top 40 station, WTNZ-FM, the following year in 1986.

The Top 40/CHR format WJDJ had lasted until mid-January 1991 when the station dropped Top 40 and flipped to an AOR format, leaving the Somerset area without a Top 40 station but titles from the format can still be heard in AC stations in the area, neighboring Corbin's WCTT-FM and the moderate signal of Lexington's WVLK-AM. Once again, this led Top 40 listeners in the Somerset area to direct either to WLAP-FM in Lexington or WOKI in Knoxville.

WJDJ's AOR format lasted for only a couple of years until it flipped to an oldies format during the second half of the 1990s, featuring programming from Westwood One. In October 1996, the station ultimately became an all-1970s format.

On September 14, 1998, the station changed its call sign to WWZB as an adult contemporary station; it changed to WLLK on April 10, 2001, to WLLK-FM on August 2, 2005, to WSEK on August 9, 2005, as a country station, and to WSEK-FM on June 1, 2016.

former logo
