= Dorothea Warren O'Hara =

American ceramic artist (1873–1972)

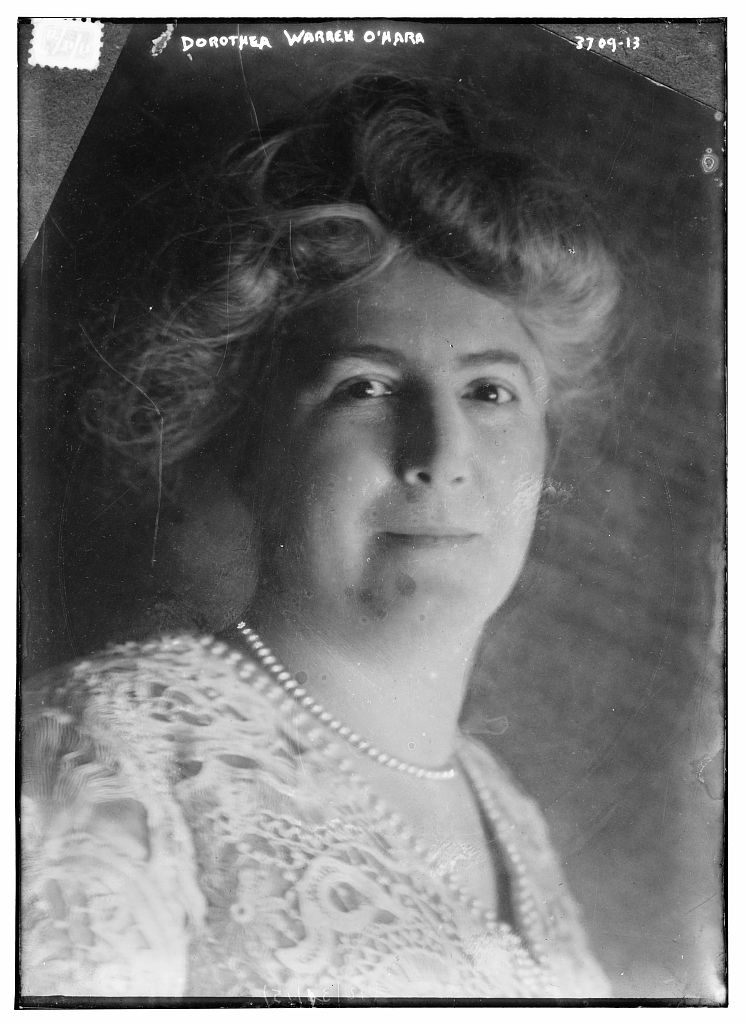
- Born: Dorothea Warren; August 31, 1873
- Died: May 1, 1972 (aged 98)

Dorothea Warren O'Hara (August 31, 1873 – May 1972) was an American ceramic artist who won the Lifetime Membership Prize from the National Arts Club and a gold medal at the Panama–Pacific International Exposition. She was president of the Keramic Society of Greater New York and president of the New York National Society of Craftsmen.

== Biography ==
Dorothea Warren was born on August 31, 1873, in Kansas City, Missouri. In 1915 she won the Lifetime Membership Prize from the National Arts Club and a gold medal at the Panama–Pacific International Exposition. In 1923 she published The Art of Enameling on Porcelain. She died in May 1972 in Delray Beach, Florida.

== Legacy ==
Her works are on display at the Metropolitan Museum of Art in New York City and the Ueno Royal Museum in Tokyo.

== Works ==
- The Art of Enameling on Porcelain. (1912)
- Dorothea Warren O'Hara Enamels, for Decorating All Kinds of China, by the Roessler and Hasslacher Chemical Company (1920)
