= Somerset Community College =

Public college in Somerset, Kentucky, US

- Type: Public community college
- Established: 2002
- Parent institution: Kentucky Community and Technical College System
- President: Carey W Castle
- Location: Somerset, Kentucky, United States; 37.0593°N 84.6166°W
- Colors: Navy █ and Gold █
- Website: http://www.somerset.kctcs.edu

Somerset Community College (SCC) is a public community college in Somerset, Kentucky. It is part of the Kentucky Community and Technical College System (KCTCS). The college offers academic, general education, and technical curricula leading to certificates, diplomas, and associate degrees. Somerset Community College is accredited by the Commission on Colleges of the Southern Association of Colleges and Schools (SACS).

== History ==
The 2002 consolidation of Laurel Technical College, Somerset Community College, and Somerset Technical College produced a comprehensive community and technical college whose beginning reaches back to 1940. Originally a part of the University of Kentucky's Community College System, Somerset Community College opened in 1965 with approximately 300 students on a single campus in Somerset, Kentucky. The college extended its campus east to London, Kentucky and south to Whitley City, Kentucky in 1992. The college operated an off-campus program in several surrounding counties before 1992, but the Laurel Center in London and the McCreary Center in Whitley City were the first two permanent centers outside Somerset Community College's original Pulaski County, Kentucky home. The Russell Center in Russell Springs, Kentucky opened in 2003 and the Clinton Center in Albany, Kentucky opened in 2004. In January 2007, SCC opened a branch campus in Casey County (Liberty, Kentucky).

Laurel Technical College began in London, Kentucky in 1971 as a vocational school governed by the Kentucky Department of Education. The school added a post-secondary component in 1985 and began offering programs designed to teach adult learners both academic and technical skills.

Somerset Technical College began in 1940 under the Somerset Board of Education's control. Originally named the Somerset Vocational School, the institution came under Kentucky Department of Education governance in 1970. The school offered Kentucky's first publicly supported aviation maintenance program, and began accepting post-secondary students in 1970.

== Service area ==
The primary service area of SCC includes:

- Casey County
- Clay County
- Clinton County
- Laurel County
- McCreary County
- Pulaski County
- Rockcastle County
- Russell County
- Wayne County
- Whitley County

== Campuses ==
Somerset Community College serves students on two campuses and four centers in south-central Kentucky. The college offers distance learning opportunities through online classes, televised courses, and courses at off-campus sites throughout southern Kentucky. In academic year 2006-2007 Somerset Community College served 6,319 students from 77 of Kentucky's 120 counties.

== Notable students and alumni ==
- Tara Conner, Miss USA 2006
