= Port Orchard Independent =

Weekly newspaper in Port Orchard, Washington, U.S.

- Type: Weekly newspaper
- Format: Broadsheet
- Owner: Sound Publishing
- Founder: Thomas Cline
- Editor: Tyler Shuey
- Founded: 1886 (as Kitsap County Pioneer)
- Language: English
- Headquarters: 2419 Bethel Ave., Suite 101 Port Orchard, Kitsap County, WA 98366
- Circulation: 971 (as of 2023)
- ISSN: 1082-1198
- OCLC number: 17297781
- Website: kitsapdailynews.com

The Port Orchard Independent is a weekly newspaper serving Port Orchard and southern Kitsap County, Washington. It is owned by Sound Publishing, an imprint of Black Press, and is part of the Kitsap News Group's weekly publications.

== History ==
On Aug. 14 1886, Thomas Cline published the first edition of Kitsap County Pioneer in Sidney. The town was later renamed to Port Orchard. Under its masthead read: "A Republican Newspaper, Independent in All Things and Neutral in Nothing - Devoted to the Interests of Kitsap County and Western Washington." Cline was a relative of Henry Cline, who opened the town's first store. After Sidney failed to become the county seat, he sold the paper to Adrian H. Stroufe, who worked as his typesetter.

In October 1889, Cline started another paper in Sidney called the People's Broadax, also known as the Sidney Broad Ax. Its motto was: "Hew to the Line, Let the Chips Fall Where They May." In January 1891, Cline sold the paper to J. Upton Shaffer and H.H. Green, who renamed it to the Sidney Herald. Ownership reverted to Cline who sold the paper again in July 1981, this time to T. R. Needham and T. C. Lindsley. The duo hired Shaffer to work as editor and renamed the paper to the Sidney Independent. The new owners only printed a few issues before selling out to Walter H. Wheeler in August 1891.

In August 1892, the Pioneer merged with the Sidney Independent. The new proprietors were Wheeler and F. J. Browne, with Stroufe retiring. In June 1898, the Sidney Independent was renamed to the Port Orchard Independent. Wheeler remained the owner and publisher of the paper until he sold it to W. L. Thompson and E. E. Brooks in 1899. They owned the paper for more than six years until selling it to a company called The Independent Printing Co., which sold paper in 1906 to the Gale Printing Co., publisher of The Bremerton News. The business was owned by American Civil War veteran Hirum Gale and his two sons, Ed and Charles.

On Jan. 1, 1911, a fire destroyed the paper's plant in Bremerton and printing was moved to Seattle. Most of the paper's historical records and archive were lost. In October 1913, the paper lost the right to use its name over a $300 debit from an unpaid mortgage. So the paper was renamed to the Port Orchard Dreadnought, although it is unclear for how long this change lasted, if it was even implemented at all. The company briefly leased the paper back to Wheeler and sold it to E. S. Smith.

In 1923, Guy Wetzel purchased the Independent and published it for two decades. A year after the sale Wetzel bought and installed a new linotype machine. On May 1, 1943, L.K. Lathrop of Poulsbo and Willard Chase of Renton bought the paper from Wetzel. Lathrop sold it in June 1947 to Jack. H. Rogers, a state senator who owned the Manette News and Kitsap County News. In June 1955, the Bremerton Typographical Union Local 699 went on strike and picketed outside the Independent's office. The union had been contracted to work at the paper's plant since 1942 and claimed owner Rogers refused to renew their contract and hired non-union workers to replace them.

In September 1966, Jack and Dorothy Rogers sold the paper, along with the East Bremerton News and Silverdale Breeze, to Independent Publishing Co. Ace Comstock owned a third of the new business while Dave and Verda Averill owned two thirds. Tom Meyers of Port Orchard was also listed as an owner of the corporation. Comstock was named publisher while the Averills focused on their other two papers, the Kitsap County Herald and Bainbridge Island Review.

In June 1976, Comstock sold the paper to J. Burton Clark of Port Orchard, John and Bob Platt of Gig Harbor, and AJ Walters of Seattle. Clark owned the Tacoma Review and Yukon Harbor Village, while the Platts owned the Peninsula Gateway. At that time the paper had a 4,300 circulation. Printing was moved to Gig Harbor following the sale.

In December 1985, David and Judy Enersen bought the paper from Jane and Paul Griffin, who operated an office supply store in town. On June 1, 1987, a fire caused by an electrical appliance destroyed the paper's office and caused $400,000 of damage. At the time the paper had three news staffers, a 8,000 circulation and was printed twice weekly. The paper's archive was unharmed. In May 1988, the couple sold the paper to Whidbey Press Inc., a subsidiary of Black Press Media. The subsidiary’s name was later changed to Sound Publishing. In 2024, Black Press was acquired by Carpenter Media Group.
