= Brian Brett =

Canadian poet, journalist, editor and novelist (1950–2024)

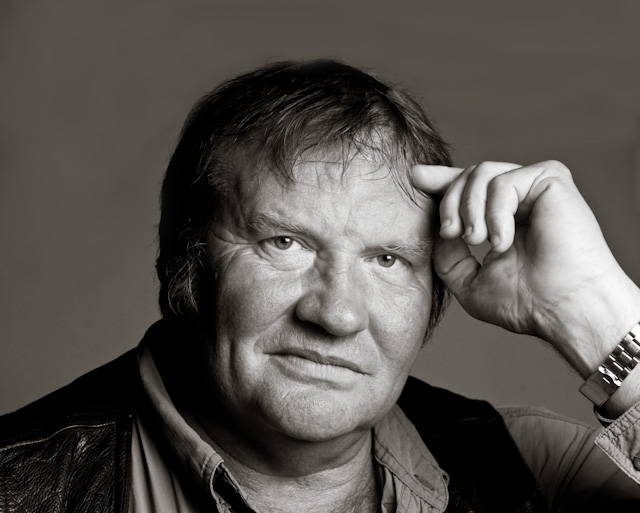
- Brett in 2009
- Born: April 28, 1950; Vancouver, British Columbia, Canada
- Died: January 17, 2024 (aged 73)
- Education: Simon Fraser University
- Occupations: Poet, novelist

Brian Brett (April 28, 1950 – January 17, 2024) was a Canadian poet, journalist, editor and novelist. Brett wrote and published extensively, starting in the late 1960s, and he worked as an editor for several publishing firms, including the Governor-General's Award-winning Blackfish Press. He also wrote a three-part memoir of his life in British Columbia.

== Early life ==
Brian Brett was born in British Columbia. He grew up with a rare endocrine disorder, Kallmann syndrome, which prevented his body from entering puberty; he later wrote a memoir about the effect this has had on his life. Brett attended Simon Fraser University between 1969 and 1974, studying literature.

== Career ==
Brian Brett in conversation with Silver Donald Cameron about his work.

Brett began writing in the 1960s. In the early 1970s, he worked as a freelance journalist and critic for The Globe and Mail, the Toronto Star, the Vancouver Sun, The New Reader, Books in Canada, and the Victoria Times-Colonist. He was a poetry critic and columnist for Vancouver's The Province. He also wrote articles for many other newspapers in Canada, and his essays appeared in many magazines. For ten years he wrote a monthly newspaper column called CultureWatch for the Yukon News.

Brett inaugurated the B.C. Poetry-in-the-Schools program, which for several years introduced students to world poetry. He has presented many writing workshops across Canada.

Brett was a member of P.E.N. International and the Federation of BC Writers, and the Writers' Union of Canada. He embarked on a national reading tour organized by the League of Canadian Poets, of which he was also a member.

Brett gave readings of his work on CBC Radio as well at universities, Harbourfront, Vancouver International Writers Festival, Saltwater Festival, Sechelt Writers' Festival, Wordfest: Banff Calgary International Writers Festival, the Winnipeg International Writers Festival, National Book Festival, and the Canada Council.

In May 2005, Brett became chair of the Writers' Union of Canada.

In 2004, Brett published a book, Uproar's Your Only Music, about his struggles with Kallmann syndrome.

In November 2009, Brett won Canada's Writers' Trust Non-Fiction Prize for Trauma Farm: A Rebel History of Rural Life. The book describes a typical day in the life of his farm, with insight into the natural history of farming.

In 2016, the Writers' Trust of Canada awarded Brett the Matt Cohen Lifetime Award to honour his body of work.

== Personal life and death ==
Brett lived on his farm on Salt Spring Island, British Columbia. He took testosterone to mitigate the effects of Kallmann syndrome, which included pain and osteoporosis. Brett died on January 17, 2024, at the age of 73.

== Bibliography ==
- Fossil Ground at Phantom Creek - 1976
- Smoke Without Exit - 1984
- Evolution in Every Direction - 1987
- The Fungus Garden - 1988
- Tanganyika - 1991
- Poems: New and Selected - 1993
- Allegories of Love and Disaster - 1993
- The Colour of Bones in a Stream - 1998
- Coyote - 2003 ISBN 1-894345-53-3
- Uproar's Your Only Music - 2004 ISBN 1-55096-607-3
- Trauma Farm: A Rebel History of Rural Life - 2009 ISBN 978-1-55365-474-2
- The Wind River Variations - 2012 ISBN 0889822697
- Tuco: The Parrot, the Others, and a Scattershot World - 2015 ISBN 1771640634

== Discography ==
- Night Directions for the Lost- The Talking Songs of Brian Brett Tongue & Groove Records - 2003
- Talking Songs by Scattered Bodies - 2014

== Anthologies ==
- Poems from Planet Earth, (Poetry), Leaf Press, Winter 2013.
- In The Flesh, Twenty Writers Explore the Body, (Essays) Brindle & Glass, ed. by Lynne Van Luven & Kathy Page, 2011.
- Measure of the Year, (introduction), by Roderick Haig-Brown, Touchwood Editions, 2011.
- The Heart Does Break: Canadian Writers on Grief and Mourning, (Essays) Random House. Ed. By George Bowering and Jean Baird. Random House. 2009.
- Open Wide Wilderness: Canadian Nature Poems, Wilfrid Laurier Press, ed. by Nancy Holmes. 2009.
- A Verse Map of Vancouver ed. By George McWhirter, Anvil Press, 2009.
- Wild Rivers of the Yukon's Peel Watershed: A Traveller's Guide (Poetry & Prose), Juri Peepre and Sarah Locke, 2008.
- Writing The West Coast, Ronsdale Press, 2008.
- Three Rivers: The Yukon's Great Boreal Wilderness Harbour Publishing, 2005.
- Rendezvous With The Wild Houghton Mifflin, 2004.
- The Eye In The Thicket (Natural History Essays) Thistledown Books 2002.
- Mocambo Nights, ed. by Patrick Lane, Ekstasis Editions, 2001.
- Lost Classics ed. by Ondaatje, Spalding, Redhill (Essays) Anchor Classics, 2001.
- In The Clear (Fiction & Poetry) Thistledown Books, 1998.
- What is Already Known (Fiction & Poetry) Thistledown Books, 1995.
- How I Learned To Speak Dog (Poetry & Prose) Douglas & McIntyre.
- Witness To Wilderness (Poetry & Prose), Arsenal Pulp Press, 1994.
- Because You Loved Being A Stranger, (Poems) ed. by Susan Musgrave, Harbour Publishing, 1994.
- Myths & Voices (Short Stories), White Pine Press, U.S.A.,1993.
- The Last Map Is The Heart (Short Stories), Thistledown Books, 1989.
- 15 Years In Exile, Exile, 1992.
- Vancouver Poetry (Poetry), Polestar Press, 1986.
- For Rexroth (Poetry), The Ark, 1980.
- Western Windows (Poetry & Prose), Commcept Publishing Ltd., 1977.
- A Government Job At Last (Poetry), MacLeod Books, 1977.
