= Snoqualmie Valley Record =

Newspaper and website reporting on the Snoqualmie Valley

- Front page of the Snoqualmie Valley Record on March 13, 2020.
- Type: Weekly newspaper
- Format: Tabloid
- Owner: Sound Publishing
- Founder: B.N. Kennedy
- Publisher: Sound Publishing
- General manager: William Shaw
- Opinion editor: Andy Hobbs
- Staff writers: Conor Wilson, Cameron Sheppard
- Founded: October 16, 1913; 113 years ago
- Language: English
- Headquarters: 11630 Slater Ave NE #8, Kirkland, Washington 98034
- City: Snoqualmie, Washington
- Country: United States
- Circulation: 667 Friday (as of 2023)
- OCLC number: 70281625
- Website: valleyrecord.com
- Free online archives: valleyrecord.com/e-editions

The Snoqualmie Valley Record is a weekly newspaper in King County, Washington, United States. The paper was founded as the North Bend Post in 1913 and has published continuously since 1923 as the Snoqualmie Valley Record. The paper covers news in the Snoqualmie Valley, which includes North Bend, Snoqualmie, Preston, Fall City, Carnation, and Duvall.

== History ==
The paper originated from the North Bend Post, which began operations on October 16, 1913, in the Tanner district east of North Bend. The paper was published by B.N. Kennedy, who earlier had established the Bridgeport Post in April 1904. In 1913, the paper masthead was changed to the Snoqualmie Post, edited by J.R. Walkup and distributed to the Upper Snoqualmie Valley.

George Astel, a printer and publisher, created the Snoqualmie Valley Record in 1923, which was to serve as another paper for the Snoqualmie Valley as well as being a start for Astel's printing business. In 1923, George Astel bought H. W. Rodman's Snoqualmie Post and merged it with the Snoqualmie Valley Record. Once the two papers consolidated, the Snoqualmie Valley Record office was expanded to fit the machinery from the Post. The paper was distributed for free within the Snoqualmie Valley with a reported circulation of 1,500 in 1923. When the two papers merged, Frances Harrison, Astel's wife, took over responsibilities as editor-in-chief and business manager, as Astel chose to focus his efforts on developing a statewide printing business, Craftsman Press.

The Record was purchased by Robert Sawyer in 1928. Sawyer expanded coverage to surrounding areas all the way up to Duvall. The paper credits two staff journalists, but Sawyer would supplement their small staff by receiving news though letter correspondence. In 1944 Sawyer sold the paper to Dale Krebs, a Linotype operator with experience working at weekly publications in Nebraska, California, and Alaska.

In 1949, Charlotte Paul Groshell and her husband Ed Groshell bought the newspaper for $30,000 from Dale Krebs. While running the paper, Charlotte wrote several best-selling books, including the 1955 Minding Our Own Business published by Random House, in which she detailed her and her husband's life purchasing and operating the Snoqualmie Valley Record. The book was dedicated to "the Valley Record subscriber". The book was a best-seller in 1955 and a sequel titled And Four to Grow was written shortly after.

Bob Scott, Sandie Scott, and Gaillard Buchman purchased the paper from Charlotte and Ed Groshell in the mid-1960s and created Falls Printing Co., which owned and operated the paper. Bob Scott became the publisher of the paper. After 36 years, in 1996, Falls Printing Co. sold the Valley Record to Karen and Jim McKiernan, the daughter and son in-law of Bob and Sandie Scott.

The newspaper was sold again four years later in December 2000 to King County Journal Newspapers, a company owned by the Horvitz family, which published several newspapers including the King County Journal. In 2006, King County Journal Newspapers was sold to Sound Publishing. In March 2020, due to the COVID-19 recession, Sound Publishing announced it would reduce staffing and suspend the print version of the Valley Record indefinitely but continue to publish digitally. In August 2026, the paper closed its office, with all remaining staff working from home moving forward.

== Publications ==
- Snoqualmie Valley Record: The main news publication of Valley Record published weekly on tabloid sized paper and distributed for $1.50 an issue.
- Snoqualmie Valley Visitors Guide: A yearly publication and supplement to the Snoqualmie Valley Record that details dining, shopping, art, entertainment, events and maps within the Snoqualmie Valley.
- Best of the Valley: A yearly award publication and supplement to the Snoqualmie Valley Record that awards local businesses, people and local entertainment.
