= Whidbey News-Times =

Newspaper in Oak Harbor, Washington

- Type: Biweekly newspaper
- Format: Broadsheet
- Owner: Sound Publishing
- Editor: Jessie Stensland
- Staff writers: Marina Blatt, Allyson Ballard
- Founded: 1891
- Headquarters: 800 SE Barrington Dr, Oak Harbor, WA 98277
- Circulation: 2,782 (as of 2023)
- Sister newspapers: South Whidbey Record
- ISSN: 1060-7161
- OCLC number: 17196050
- Website: whidbeynewstimes.com

Whidbey News-Times is a twice-weekly (Wednesday and Saturday) newspaper published in Oak Harbor, Washington, United States covering general news on Whidbey Island. It is owned by Sound Publishing Inc., a subsidiary of Black Press. Its sister paper is the South Whidbey Record. Another sister paper, the Whidbey Examiner, was shuttered in 2017.

The News-Times was published in Oak Harbor until 2010, when its operations were merged with those of the Record in Coupeville, Washington. It returned to Oak Harbor in 2020.

== History ==
On March 21, 1890, Charles W. Angel published the first edition of the Island County Sun in Coupeville, Washington. On March 17, 1891, a rival paper called the Island County Times was started by The Island County Publishing Co. The Times, published on Tuesdays, was a political and religious alternative to the Sun, published on Saturdays. On June 1, 1894, E. G. Earle, who had been managing editor of the Walla Walla Union, bought both papers and combined them under the name Island County Times. The next owner was D.C. Pearson who bought the paper in 1900, followed by B. J. White in 1905. White sold the paper in December 1905 to W. T. Howard, of Nebraska.

On Oct. 11, 1911, H.L. Bowmer founded the Oak Harbor News. In 1917, the paper was made the official publication of the Island County Farm Bureau and its name was changed to the Farm Bureau News. The Bureau later disbanded but the paper kept the name and continued to focus on the area's farmers. In 1923, Bowmer sold the News to Al J. Whitney.

Howard published the Times for 19 years and was succeeded by Beriah Brown in 1925. Bowmer sold the News to George B. Astel in 1931. Within a few years he purchased the Times and another paper in Langley. In August 1939, A. Glenn Smith and his wife Phyllis bought the Whidbey Press Publishing Co. from Astel, which published the Oak Harbor News, Island County Times and Whidbey Island Record. On Oct. 1, 1959, the Times absorbed the Oak Harbor News to form the Whidbey News-Times. Before the consolidation, the Times had a circulation of 600 and the News had 2,900 subscribers.

The Smiths sold their business in February 1965 to Wallie V. Funk and John J. Webber, who three years prior owned the Anacortes American until it was sold to the Skagit Valley Herald. In January 1988, the two sold the company after running it for 23 years to David Holmes Black, owner of Black Press. In 2024, Black Press was acquired by Carpenter Media Group. In 2026, the Saturday edition of the News-Times and Record were merged.
