= Journal-American =

Journal-American may refer to:

- New York Journal-American, a daily newspaper published in New York City, New York, from 1937 to 1966
- Journal-American (Washington), a weekly newspaper published in Bellevue, Washington, from 1976 to 2002
