= Midweek =

The word Midweek normally refers to the middle of the week. It can also refer to:

- MidWeek, a newspaper based in Hawaii
- Midweek, a topical political series airing weekly on TV3 (Ireland)
- Midweek (BBC Radio 4), a BBC radio programme on Radio 4
- Midweek, a weekly newspaper covering South Buckinghamshire, England every Tuesday. It is published by the Bucks Free Press, which itself is published weekly on Fridays.
