= Barbara L. Drinkwater =

American physiologist and basketball coach (1926–2019)

President of the American College of Sports Medicine
- In office 1988–1989

Personal details
- Born: Barbara Lee Drinkwater; November 18, 1926 Plainfield, New Jersey, U.S.
- Died: September 30, 2019 (aged 92) Gold Canyon, Arizona, U.S.
- Education: Douglass College; University of North Carolina at Greensboro; Purdue University
- Occupation: Physiologist; basketball coach

Academic work
- Discipline: Sports physiology
- Sub-discipline: Relative energy deficiency in sport
- Institutions: University of California, Santa Barbara; University of Washington; Pacific Medical Center
- Basketball career
- Coaching career: fl. 1959–1960

Career history

Coaching
- fl. 1959–1960: Butler Bulldogs

Barbara Lee Drinkwater (November 18, 1926 – September 30, 2019) was an American physiologist who specialized in sports physiology and was the first woman to be president of the American College of Sports Medicine (1988–1989). Prior to that, she also coached the Butler Bulldogs women's basketball team.

== Biography ==
=== Early life and career ===
Barbara Lee Drinkwater was born in Plainfield, New Jersey, on November 18, 1926, and graduated in 1944 from Somerville High School as one of four students selected to speak at graduation ceremonies. After studying at Douglass College (BSc) and University of North Carolina at Greensboro (MSc), she obtained her PhD from Purdue University. (Note: Sources differ as to what field the PhD was in. Nicole R. Keith says that this was sports psychology, but the Island Beachcomber says that this was exercise physiology.)

In addition to teaching physical education and swimming, she was the coach of the Butler Bulldogs women's basketball team, and her undefeated 1959–1960 team was inducted to the Butler University Athletics Hall of Fame in 2023.

=== Academic career ===
As a researcher, Drinkwater specialized in exercise physiology and women's athletic health and, according to the Island Beachcomber, "pioneered research in the field of women's athletics". Susan Carter described Drinkwater as "a forerunner" in research on relative energy deficiency in sport. In December 1975, she told Sports Illustrated that the Fosbury flop, a jumping style used in the high jump, is "no good for women".

Drinkwater worked at the University of California, Santa Barbara Institute of Environmental Stress and the University of Washington Department of Kinesiology, before assuming leadership of the Pacific Medical Center Osteoporosis Research Laboratory In 1988, she became the first woman president of the American College of Sports Medicine, serving until 1989. In addition to serving as vice-president and as a trustee, she also helped with increasing Black representation in the ACSM's committees and was a member of fifteen of them.

In addition to being a Fellow of the American College of Sports Medicine, Drinkwater won a 1984 ACSM Citation Award and the 1996 ACSM Honor Award. She was elected fellow of the National Academy of Kinesiology in 1980. She was awarded honorary doctorates of science by De Montfort University in 1999 and by the University of Toronto in 2001. She was the 1989 D.B. Dill Historical Lecturer and the 1994 Joseph B. Wolffe Memorial Lecturer. She won the 2014 President's Council on Sports, Fitness, and Nutrition Lifetime Achievement Award.

She was also one of the founders of Women Sport International, and served as their treasurer and vice-president until 2011. She was a member of the International Olympic Committee Medical Commission's Medical and Scientific Group.

=== Personal life and death ===
In 1983, she moved to Vashon, Washington, where she later started an animal shelter called Vashon Island Pet Protectors. She was also a camp counselor, licensed to pilot light aircraft, and a scuba instructor, and she played golf and collected rocks as hobbies.

Drinkwater died on September 30, 2019, in Gold Canyon, Arizona.
