= South Whidbey Record =

Newspaper in Langley, Washington

- Type: Biweekly newspaper
- Format: Broadsheet
- Owner: Sound Publishing
- Founder: Frank Niles
- Editor: Jessie Stensland
- Staff writers: Kira Erickson, Karina Andrew, Rachel Rosen
- Founded: 1923
- Language: English
- Headquarters: 800 SE Barrington Dr, Oak Harbor, WA 98277
- Circulation: 2,109 (as of 2023)
- Sister newspapers: Whidbey News-Times
- ISSN: 1064-0622
- OCLC number: 17196117
- Website: southwhidbeyrecord.com

The South Whidbey Record is a newspaper based in Langley, Washington, United States. It publishes Wednesdays and Saturdays.

The paper started as the Whidby Record and later changed its name in the 1940s to The Whidbey Record when the proper spelling of the island's namesake, Joseph Whidbey, was discovered to have an "e" in it. The paper adopted its present name in 1981.

== History ==
In 1923, Frank Niles moved his printing plant from Everett to Langley, Washington to start a newspaper called the Whidby Record. In May 1934, Niles sold the paper to Mr. and Mrs. M. W. McQuillin. That October, the couple sold the paper to George B. Astel, owner of the Island County Times in Coupeville and Farm Bureau News in Oak Harbor.

In August 1939, A. Glenn Smith and his wife Phyllis bought the Whidbey Press Publishing Co. from Astel, which published the Oak Harbor News, Island County Times and Whidbey Island Record. On October 1, 1959, the Times absorbed the News to form the Whidbey News-Times.

In February 1965, the Smiths sold their business to Wallie V. Funk and John J. Webber, who three years prior owned the Anacortes American until it was sold to the Skagit Valley Herald. In January 1988, the two sold the company after running it for 23 years to David Holmes Black, owner of Black Press. By 1989, the Record's circulation was reported as 3,100.

A series of winter storms in 2006–07 caused more than nine power outages on Whidbey Island, which challenged the paper's operations, but Sound Publishing, the subsidiary operating the Record, was able to maintain its production schedule. In 2024, Black Press was acquired by Carpenter Media Group. In 2026, the Saturday edition of the Record and the News-Times were merged.

== See also ==
List of newspapers in Washington (state)
