= Nanaimo Daily News =

- Type: Daily newspaper
- Format: Broadsheet
- Owner: Black Press
- Founder: George Norris
- Publisher: Andrea Rosato-Taylor
- Editor: Philip Wolf
- Founded: 1874
- Ceased publication: 2016
- Language: English
- Headquarters: 2575 McCullough Road; Nanaimo, British Columbia; V9S 5W5
- City: Nanaimo
- Country: Canada
- Circulation: 5,394 daily in 2012
- Website: www.nanaimodailynews.com

The Nanaimo Daily News was a Canadian daily newspaper published weekdays in Nanaimo, on Vancouver Island in British Columbia for 141 years until ceasing publication in January 2016.

The paper's final owner was Black Press, which also publishes the Alberni Valley Times and the Ladysmith-Chemainus Chronicle, and several other weekly newspapers on the island.

== History ==
George Norris founded the paper as the semi-weekly Nanaimo Free Press in 1874. It began publishing six times a week, Monday to Saturday, 14 years later in 1888. In 1902, after George Norris died, the paper was continued on by his two sons, George E. and Wilf F. Norris, who later sold the paper to Thomas Banks Booth.

In 1954, Thomson Newspapers bought the Free Press and the title eventually became Nanaimo Daily Free Press. Publishers included Cec Ramsden, John Farrington, Stan Butler and Bob McKenzie, and others.

In the late 1990s, the newspaper was bought by the Southam Inc. chain, which itself was part of Hollinger Inc. This chain was, at the time, the dominant newspaper publisher in British Columbia, and also included the Alberni Valley Times, Times Colonist and several weeklies. The Nanaimo Daily Free Press became the Nanaimo Daily News.

In 2000, along with the rest of Southam, ownership of the Vancouver Island newspapers passed to Canwest, then Postmedia Network in 2010.

In 2011, Postmedia sold its Vancouver Island properties and Lower Mainland weeklies to Glacier Media for $86.5 million.

In 2013, the Daily News attracted controversy and criticism for alleged "racism" for publishing a letter to the editor that was critical of First Nations. Over 100 people, including the city's serving mayor, protested the publication. The Daily News apologized to those who were offended by the letter itself, but refused to apologize for publishing the letter under the doctrine of free speech. Later that year they published another letter critical of First Nations, and once again refused to apologize, as they considered it the role of a newspaper to protect and promote freedom of speech.

In 2015, Glacier Media sold all its island papers except for the Times Colonist to Black Press.

In January 2016, Black Press announced the closing of the Daily News while maintaining its separate newspaper, the Nanaimo News Bulletin.

The newspaper is proud of its stubborn insistence on referring to the citizenry of Nanaimo as "Nanaimoites" instead of "Nanaimoans." Local literary lore posits that the early editors of the newspapers presumed that "Nanaimoans" was too difficult for a predominantly blue-collar readership to pronounce. Despite being advised that the people of Chicago are known as Chicagoans, not Chicagoites, and that the people of Orlando are known as Orlandoans, not Orlandoites, and further that the people of Toledo are known as Toledoans, not Toledoites, the newspaper's editors remain unmoved.

In 2018, the Library of Vancouver Island University (VIU) undertook a project to digitize and provide an Open Access digital archive of early issues of the Nanaimo Free Press to ensure preservation of content of regional significance, as well as to provide access for citizens and scholars. Microform for the Nanaimo paper is also held by the VIU Library, by the BC Archives, and print editions of the paper are in the collection of the Nanaimo Museum.

== See also ==
- List of newspapers in Canada
