= Times Colonist =

Canadian newspaper in Victoria, British Columbia

- Type: Daily newspaper
- Format: Broadsheet
- Owner: TC Publication Limited Partnership (Glacier Media)
- Publisher: Dave Obee
- Editor: Dave Obee
- Founded: 1884/1858/1980
- Language: English
- Headquarters: 201-655 Tyee Road; Victoria, British Columbia; V9A 6X5
- Circulation: less than 35,000 weekdays less than 35,000 Saturday less than 35,000 Sundays in 2018
- ISSN: 0839-427X
- Website: www.timescolonist.com

The Times Colonist is an English-language daily newspaper in Victoria, British Columbia, Canada. It was formed by the September 2, 1980, merger of the Victoria Daily Times, established in 1884, and the British Colonist (later the Daily Colonist), established in 1858 by Amor De Cosmos who was later British Columbia's second premier. The British Colonist was B.C.'s first paper "of any permanence". De Cosmos was the editor until 1866 when D. W. Higgins took over—he would remain in the role for the next twenty years.

Local news receives the greatest prominence in the Times Colonist. Stories and photographs about Greater Victoria are often featured on the front page. The newspaper also has national and international stories, plus sections covering the arts, sports, and business. The Times Colonist has a website as well as an e-edition, which offers a digital replica of the printed pages. According to News Media Canada, the Times Colonist saw an average daily circulation of 58,297 in 2015. From 2016 and into the 2020s, the average press run was below 31,000 copies daily. The Times Colonist is published six days a week (Tuesday to Sunday) and is sold by subscription or at newsstands.

== History ==
On August 2, 1980, The Daily Colonist newspaper front page proclaimed "Merger pains lead to birth of new daily". Victoria Press Ltd., which produced both the Daily Colonist and the Victoria Times, could no longer sustain both competing newspapers without making significant financial cuts, Vice-President Colin McCullough wrote in a statement. Instead, both papers would fold, in what the paper called "the demise of two of Canada's oldest newspapers". The newly-formed Times-Colonist newspaper would be delivered twice-daily and subscriptions would continue to cost 5 dollars a month, although the newsstand price of the Saturday paper would rise from 5 to 35 cents.

The merger resulted in layoffs — 53 full-time and eight part-time employees were let go, resulting in challenges from union representatives and fired staffers.

The first edition of the Times Colonist was published September 2, 1980. In 1983, the newspaper stopped printing both a morning and afternoon edition and moved to daily morning publication.

A two-storey Victoria Press Building had been constructed on Douglas Street in 1971, replacing smaller offices built on the same street in 1951. The Victoria Press Building remained the headquarters of the Times Colonist after the 1980 merger and up until the building's sale in 2017. The Victoria Heritage Society has deemed the building architecturally notable for its "characteristics of the Late Modern style including its pre-cast concrete panels, exposed aggregate stucco cladding [...] and its full-height central entryway with rounded pre-cast concrete walls."

In 1998, Southam Newspapers bought the Times Colonist. Two years later, it was sold again to CanWest Publications. On July 13, 2010, the Postmedia Network acquired CanWest Publications and all of its assets, including the Times Colonist.

On October 18, 2011, the Postmedia Network announced it would sell the Times Colonist, Nanaimo Daily News and Alberni Valley Times, as well as 20 weekly and bi-weekly community papers, to Glacier Media for $86.5 million.

In 2017, the Victoria Press Building was sold to Merchant House Capital. In 2018, the newspaper announced it would no longer print its own paper, allowing staff to focus on the content and distribution of the newspaper. Since October 1, 2018, the newspaper has been printed by Black Press in Ladysmith. The newspaper offices were moved in 2020 to Upper Harbour Place, a mixed-used residential and office building on Tyee Road in Victoria West.

In June 2019, it was announced the first 122 years of the British Colonist (later, the Daily Colonist) would be available online, with free access, through the efforts of the Times Colonist, the University of Victoria and other funding partners. The digitized newspaper collection is reported to be one of the most popular database on the university's website.

On May 28, 2022, the Times Colonist reported its former building would reopen that summer—new tenants include a brewery and commercial kitchen space. The newspaper will not be returning to the building as a tenant when it reopens.

== Circulation ==
The Times Colonist has seen a decline in print circulation in the last decade. Its total circulation dropped by 10 percent to 58,297 copies daily from 2009 to 2015. From 2016 to 2021, the average press run was below 31,000 copies daily. Since 2021, that number has dropped below 25,000 copies daily.

Daily average

== See also ==
- List of newspapers in Canada
