= David Holmes Black =

Canadian newspaper publisher

- Born: April 9, 1946 (age 80); Vancouver, British Columbia, Canada
- Education: University of British Columbia; University of Western Ontario
- Organization: Black Press Group Ltd. (1975-2024)
- Title: Former Chairman of Black Press Group Ltd. (1975-2024)

David Holmes Black (born April 9, 1946), is a Canadian media proprietor who founded and was the majority owner of Black Press Group Ltd. He served as the company's chairman until it was sold in 2024, and previously served as its chief executive officer and president.

Black has served as president of the British Columbia and Yukon Community Newspaper Association, a director of the Canadian Community Newspaper Association, a governor of the Canadian Newspaper Association, and as a director of the American Press Institute.

In 2008, Black received the Margaret Hennigar Award for Exemplary Leadership from the Canadian Community Newspaper Association and was made an Honorary life time member. A year later Black was inducted the Business Laureates of British Columbia Hall of Fame in 2009.

As of 2022, Black Press and its subsidiaries own more than 170 titles throughout western Canada and the United States.

After entering bankruptcy proceedings in 2024, it was announced that Carpenter Media Group had completed its acquisition of Black Press, in a deal that involved Canso Investment Counsel, Ltd. The company will remain Canadian-owned and based in Surrey, British Columbia.

== Early life and education ==
Black was born in Vancouver, British Columbia to Alan and Adelaide Black. He graduated from the University of British Columbia with a degree in civil engineering. He then obtained his MBA at the University of Western Ontario. After school, he briefly worked for Crown Life Insurance in the early '70s.

In 1973, Black was hired to work as a junior business analyst in the acquisitions department at Torstar, which publishes the Toronto Star newspaper.

== Founding Black Press Media ==
Black started his newspaper company in 1975 when he purchased the Williams Lake Tribune of Williams Lake, British Columbia for $60,000. The paper had previously been owned since 1969 by his father Alan Black and the paper's publisher Clive Stangoe.

Black operated the Tribune exclusively for four years until purchasing the husband-and-wife owned Ashcroft-Cache Creek Journal in nearby Ashcroft in 1979. Black continued to purchase other newspapers over time and soon formed newspaper clusters around Victoria and Vancouver.

In 1987, Black formed Sound Publishing after he purchased three newspapers on the Kitsap Peninsula in the United States. The subsidy has since managed all of his titles in Washington (state) and Alaska.

In 2001, Black purchased the Honolulu Star-Bulletin. In 2010, Black purchased The Honolulu Advertiser and merged the two Hawaiian papers together to create the Honolulu Star-Advertiser. The paper is managed by a subsidy, Oahu Publications, along with all other publications Black owns in Hawaii.

As of 2022, News Media Canada reported Black Press publishes 106 editions across Canada with a combined circulation of 1,295,243. The number of titles include 70 in British Columbia, 11 in Alberta, two in Northwest Territories and one in Yukon.

== Oil refinery (2012-2016) ==
On August 17, 2012, Black announced he is putting forth a proposal to build a $13.2 billion oil refinery in Kitimat with his company, Kitimat Clean Ltd. The refinery would turn bitumen from the Alberta oil sands into solid pellets for shipment by train to the refinery north. At full capacity, 400,000 barrels of petroleum products would be produced a day and then be loaded onto tankers for shipment to markets globally.

Black used his personal funds to pay for feasibility and environmental studies for the project.

In March 2013, Black said he partnered with Oppenheimer Investments Group, a Switzerland-based firm, to raise the funds to proceed. At that time the original price tag of the refinery itself had risen to $16 billion due to switching to new technologies to reduce greenhouse gases. Other factors raised the total cost for the Kitimat Clean Refinery Project to $22 billion.

In April 2013, Black said the Industrial and Commercial Bank of China had agreed to become an investor and financial advisor for the project.

In 2016, Black submitted a 129 page project description to federal and provincial regulators for the environmental assessment process. On October 2, 2016, the federal environmental assessment of the project was suspended at the request of the proponent.

== Personal life ==
Black resides in Victoria, British Columbia. In 1970, Black married Annabeth Cote. The two first met while they were students at the University of British Columbia. The couple had four children together: twin sons Alan and Fraser, and daughters Morgan and Catherine. As of 2012, Black has nine grandchildren with some notable being Vann and Tucker. His wife Annabeth died of pancreatic cancer on August 23, 2006. Black is a member of the Royal Vancouver Yacht Club and owns a boat called the Esperanza. Sometime in the '90s, he took a seven month break to sail 77-foot ketch across the Atlantic ocean.

Black is a supporter of the conservative BC United party and has made top-tier donations to the centre-right provincial political party. Between 2006 and 2011, Black Press contributed $5,430 to the BC Liberals.

=== Riffington Manor ===
Black lives at Riffington Manor, a prominent home in Uplands. The property along Beach Drive was built in 1913 for Scottish-born businessman Andrew Wright, one of the principal investors in the Uplands development. The stone for the mansion came from Haddington Island. The two-story house's notable features include 10 fireplaces and an octagonal entrance hall that is rose-windowed at its dome and galleried at the upper level. Four bedrooms, each with a full bathroom and dressing room, occupy the entire upper floor. A reporter for the Times Colonist in 2016 called the property "one of Victoria's most famous and historic waterfront estates."

Black has rented out the property for use as a film location, with all collected fees donated to the Victoria Hospice Society in his wife's honor. In 2017, the house was used as a location in the fourth film in the Gourmet Detective series. In 2018, the house was a film location for the Hallmark Channel original film "Once upon a Prince."

=== University of Victoria ===
Black is a long-time supporter of the University of Victoria. He served as the first board chair of the Peter B. Gustavson School of Business from 1991 to 1996. Since 2008, the annual Black Press Business Scholarship has awarded $5,000 to up to 37 students from across British Columbia entering the University of Victoria's Bachelor of Commerce program.

UVic's business school named Black "Distinguished Entrepreneur of the Year" in 2007. The university also awarded Black an honorary degree in 2014.

In 2019, the University of Victoria honored Black by naming the Black Ink Classroom in the David Strong Building lecture hall in his honor.
