= Abbotsford/Mission Times =

Canadian newspaper

- Type: Weekly newspaper
- Owner: Glacier Media
- Editor: Darren McDonald
- Language: English
- Ceased publication: December 2013
- Headquarters: Abbotsford, British Columbia, Canada
- Website: defunct (as of 2014); archived version

The Abbotsford/Mission Times was a newspaper in Abbotsford, British Columbia. It was founded in 1983.

The Abbotsford/Mission Times competed against the Abbotsford News and Mission City Record until Black Press purchased the Times from Glacier Media and announced in December 2013 that it would cease publishing the Times due to revenue losses and disinterest in staff at the Times transferring to Black Press.

== See also ==
- List of newspapers in Canada
