= Boundary Creek Times =

- Type: Weekly newspaper
- Format: Broadsheet
- Owner: Black Press
- Founded: 1896
- Ceased publication: March 31, 2022
- Language: English
- Headquarters: Greenwood, British Columbia, Canada
- Circulation: 348 (as of November 2019)
- Website: www.boundarycreektimes.com

The Boundary Creek Times was a weekly newspaper published in Greenwood, British Columbia. It published Thursday and was owned by Black Press.

== History ==
The newspaper was published between September 1896 and March 1911. The Boundary Creek Times was published by the Times Publishing Company (1896–99), and later by Boundary Creek Printing and Publishing Company (1901–1911), Duncan Ross (1897–1907) was the paper's longest-serving editor. The Boundary Creek Times was taken over by The Ledge, another Greenwood-based paper, in April 1911. In 1983 the Boundary Creek Times was revived.

In 2022, the newspaper was merged into Grand Forks Gazette. Its last edition was published on March 31.

== See also ==
- List of newspapers in Canada
