= Tacoma Daily Index =

Business newspaper in Tacoma, Washington

- Type: Daily newspaper
- Format: Tabloid
- Owner(s): Sound Publishing
- Publisher: Ken Spurrell
- Editor: Morf Morford and Danielle Nease
- Founded: May 1, 1890; 135 years ago
- Headquarters: 15 Oregon Ave, Suite 101 Tacoma, WA 98409
- Circulation: 178 (as of 2023)
- Website: tacomadailyindex.com

The Tacoma Daily Index is a daily business newspaper in Tacoma, Washington, United States. The Daily Index publishes legal notices, property sales, calls for bids, permits, and court information pertaining to Tacoma and Pierce County. It is published by Sound Publishing, a regional newspaper chain.

The Daily Index was founded on May 1, 1890, as the Daily Mortgage and Lien Record.
