= Trail Times =

Canadian local daily newspaper

Trail Daily Times
- Type: Weekly newspaper
- Format: Tabloid
- Owner(s): Black Press
- Publisher: Barb Blatchford
- Editor: Guy Bertrand
- Founded: 1895, as Trail Creek News
- Language: English
- Headquarters: 1163 Cedar Avenue, Trail, British Columbia, Canada
- Circulation: 2,201 (as of October 2022)
- Website: traildailytimes.ca

The Trail Times is a weekly newspaper in Trail, British Columbia. It publishes Tuesday and Thursday and is owned by Black Press.

The Times is the paper of record for Trail and several surrounding communities. It has carried several different names since being founded as the Trail Creek News in 1895.

== See also ==
- List of newspapers in Canada
