= Nelson Daily News =

- Type: Daily newspaper
- Founded: April 22, 1902
- Ceased publication: July 16, 2010
- Language: English
- Headquarters: Nelson, British Columbia, Canada
- ISSN: 0832-431X

The Nelson Daily News was a daily newspaper in Nelson, British Columbia, closed in 2010. Its last owner was Black Press, the largest publisher of weekly newspapers in British Columbia, which owns the competing weekly Nelson Star.

The Daily News was founded in 1902 and lasted for 109 years, serving as a newspaper of record for Nelson, which was said to be the smallest community in Canada with a daily newspaper. Daily circulation in 2010 was approximately 2,000, and the paper was in a financial decline.

Black Press purchased the Daily News in July 2010, as part of a larger deal that saw Glacier Media sell several of its British Columbia papers, mostly weeklies, to Black. Former Black executive Don Kendall bought Glacier dailies in Cranbrook and Kimberley as part of the same deal, remarking that Black "wasn't as interested in some titles – Cranbrook, Kimberley, Nelson, and Prince Rupert – but Glacier was only selling the papers as a block."

Black did purchase the Nelson Daily News and Prince Rupert Daily News in 2010, and ended up closing them days later. It already owned competing weeklies in both markets, the Nelson Star and The Northern View in Prince Rupert. Rick O'Connor, Black's chief operating officer, said the Nelson and Prince Rupert newspapers, along with two other weeklies shuttered the same day, had lost $1 million in the past year. The closure of the Nelson Daily News resulted in 25 layoffs.

After closing the Nelson Daily News, Black Press hired the News' former editor Bob Hall to run the Nelson Star, which increased its frequency from weekly to twice-weekly.

Black purchased the Daily Townsman and Daily Bulletin from Kendall a year later, promising that both "will continue to run under their current business plan and we anticipate few changes."

== See also ==
- Prince Rupert Daily News
- List of newspapers in Canada
