= Surrey Now-Leader =

Canadian newspaper in British Columbia

The Surrey Now News Leader
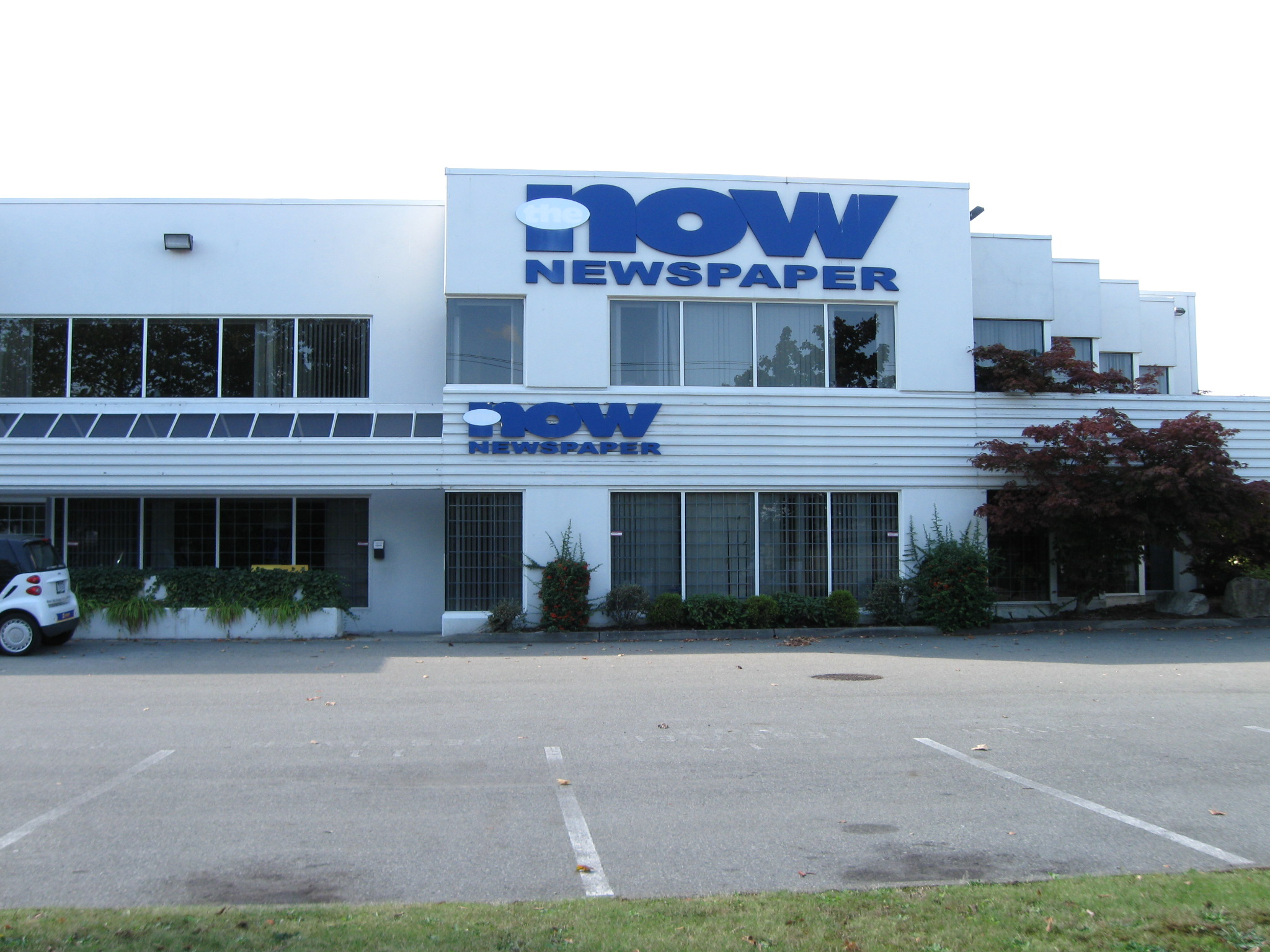
- Type: Weekly newspaper
- Format: Tabloid
- Owner: Black Press
- Publisher: Dal Hothi
- Editor: Beau Simpson
- Founded: 1984
- Headquarters: 15288 54a Avenue; Unit 210; Surrey, British Columbia; Canada V3S 5J9
- Circulation: 66,136 (as of October 2022)
- ISSN: 0841-8764
- Website: surreynowleader.com

The Surrey Now-Leader is a weekly newspaper serving Surrey, North Delta and White Rock in the Canadian province of British Columbia. It publishes Thursday and is owned by Black Press.

== History ==
The newspaper was established in 1984.

In 2015, Glacier Media sold Surrey Now to Black Press, which already owned The Surrey Leader. This sale was part a large transaction that resulted in both of those publishers effectively swapping dozens of newspapers, resulting in each publisher being in significantly fewer areas across British Columbia, but each owning both local newspapers in the areas where they remained. Also in 2015, Now reporter Amy Reid received the S. Tara Singh Hayer journalism award due to work highlighting needs of homeless people.

In March 2017, Black Press, publisher of Surrey Now (also known as The Now) and The Surrey Leader, announced that the two papers would be merged into a single paper as of April 5, 2017. Each paper published twice per week and the merged paper published twice per week. The merged paper was announced as The Surrey Now News-Leader. This was one of numerous papers owned by Black Press that merged following Black Press' transaction with Glacier Media, due to many communities having two newspapers owned by Black Press.

During the final week of March 2020, the paper reduced from publishing twice per week to once per week, citing the effects of the COVID-19 pandemic, calling this a temporary measure. The frequency has not been restored back to twice per week.

== See also ==
- List of newspapers in Canada
