= Campbell River Mirror =

Canadian newspaper in British Columbia

- Type: Weekly newspaper
- Owner: Black Press
- Publisher: Jacquie Duns
- Editor: Marc Kitteringham
- Language: English
- Headquarters: Campbell River, British Columbia, Canada
- Circulation: 17,046 (as of October 2022)
- Website: campbellrivermirror.com

Campbell River Mirror is a weekly newspaper in Campbell River, British Columbia. It publishes Wednesday and is owned by Black Press.

== See also ==
- List of newspapers in Canada
