= The Ashcroft-Cache Creek Journal =

Canadian newspaper in British Columbia

Ashcroft-Cache Creek Journal
- Type: Weekly newspaper
- Owner(s): Black Press
- Publisher: Terry Daniels
- Editor: Barbara Roden
- Founded: 1895
- Language: English
- Headquarters: Ashcroft, British Columbia, Canada
- Circulation: 515 (as of October 2022)
- Website: ashcroftcachecreekjournal.com

Ashcroft-Cache Creek Journal is a weekly newspaper in Ashcroft, British Columbia. It publishes Thursday and is owned by Black Press.

== History ==
The paper is the oldest weekly newspaper in British Columbia founded in 1895. Dr. Frank Stewart Reynolds and A.H.S. Sroufe, founded the paper The British Columbia Mining Journal. By 1899 the Mining Journal was renamed The Ashcroft Journal.

== See also ==
- List of newspapers in Canada
