= Peace Arch News =

- Type: Weekly newspaper
- Format: Tabloid
- Owner(s): Black Press
- Publisher: Steve Scott
- Editor: Brenda Anderson
- Founded: 1976
- Headquarters: Suite 202 - 15850 24 Avenue, Surrey, British Columbia, V3Z 0G1
- Circulation: 28,769 (as of October 2022)
- ISSN: 0700-9003
- Website: peacearchnews.com

The Peace Arch News is a weekly newspaper serving the White Rock and South Surrey area in British Columbia. It publishes Thursday and is owned by Black Press.

== History ==
The newspaper was founded in 1976 and has been owned by the Black Press Group since January 1997. The related but separate Peace Arch News Daily was shut down in 2014.

== See also ==
- List of newspapers in Canada
