= Enumclaw Courier-Herald =

Weekly newspaper

- Type: Weekly newspaper
- Format: Broadsheet
- Owner: Sound Publishing
- Founder: D.C. Ashmun
- Editor: Ray Miller-Still
- Founded: 1900 (as Enumclaw Courier)
- Language: English
- Headquarters: 1186 Myrtle Avenue; Enumclaw, Washington
- Circulation: 1,764 Wednesday (as of 2023)
- OCLC number: 57404034
- Website: courierherald.com

Enumclaw Courier-Herald is a newspaper in Enumclaw, Washington.

== History ==
In July 1900, D.C. Ashmun and his wife published the first edition of the Enumclaw Courier. In fall 1903, a fire destroyed the paper's office building and printing plant, but publication resumed on Dec. 4, 1903. Ashmun sold the Courier to Dr. H. R. Rust on Feb. 19, 1904. That March, Rust hired Vernon Van Buskirk, of Seattle, to operate the paper. C.C. Reber, a local merchant, launched a rival paper on Nov. 27, 1908, called the Enumclaw Herald and hired Ashmun, the Courier's founder, to run it. At that time the Courier focused on local news that was modestly editorialized while the Herald focused on human interest features.

Buskirk ran the Courier for 32 years while the Herald saw multiple owners come and go. Reber sold out to George Davis and Phil Ashmun, nephew of D.C. Ashmun. They eventually sold the Herald to G E. Hamilton, followed by H. L. Bostwick and Eugene Larin. Due to political differences, Bostwick ended their partnership and briefly operated a third paper in town. Richard Bushnell lasted six months before selling the paper to J. L. Ashbury, followed by P. D. Pederson. E. M. Berg became a co-owner and Pederson sold his share in November 1931 to Clancy B. Lafromboise.

In 1933, Buskirk purchased Berg's half of the Herald and then the paper was merged with the Courier to form the Enumclaw Courier-Herald. The first issue of the combined paper was published on Oct. 6, 1933. Buskirk sold his stake to Lafromboise in 1936. At that time the circulation was 2,000. In 1967, Lafromboise was awarded the "Award of Merit" from the National Newspaper Association, its highest honor. In 1973, the paper absorbed the Buckley News Banner.

Lafromboise ran the paper for 54 years until his death in 1986. His wife Jean Lafromboise then replaced him as president of the Courier-Herald Publishing Company. In 1987, Westmedia Corp., owner of the Longview Daily News, signed a deal with the Lafromboise family to manage the Courier-Herald for two years with the option to buy it. At that time the paper had a circulation of 6,800 and also put out a weekly shoppers guide called The Cascade Homemaker. In 1999, the McClelland-Natt family sold Westmedia to Howard Publications. The sale did not include the Courier-Herald. In 2001, Bill Marcum became the paper's publisher. On June 3, 2008, the Courier-Herald was sold by Marcum, the estate of Ted Natt; John Natt and David Natt to Sound Publishing, a subsidiary of Black Press. In 2016, the Bonney Lake-Sumner Courier-Herald was absorbed into the paper. In 2024, Black Press was sold to Carpenter Media Group.

== Headquarters ==
The newspaper was located at 1627 Cole Street until the building was torn down in 2003-2004. A new building was constructed on the same spot and the paper's staff were moved inside in June 2005. The paper moved around the corner to 1186 Myrtle Avenue in May 2019. That building was put up for sale by the newspaper in April 2024.

== See also ==
List of newspapers in Washington (state)
