= The Daily World (Aberdeen) =

Daily newspaper published in Aberdeen, Washington

- Type: Daily newspaper
- Format: Broadsheet
- Owner: Sound Publishing
- Editor: Michael Wagar
- Founded: July 31, 1889
- Language: English
- Headquarters: 315 So. Michigan, Aberdeen, Washington 98520 United States
- Circulation: 5,225 (as of 2023)
- ISSN: 0740-3135
- OCLC number: 9939554
- Website: thedailyworld.com

The Daily World is a daily newspaper in Aberdeen, Washington, United States. Serving Grays Harbor County and northern Pacific County since 1889, The Daily World is the only daily newspaper on the coast of Washington state.

== History ==
On July 31, 1889, the first edition of the Aberdeen Weekly Bulletin was published, almost three months before Washington achieved statehood. It was founded by the Bulletin Publishing Company. In March 1891, E.C. Finch sold the Bulletin to W. H. Johnston and Frank H. Owen.

In September 1891, Johnston sold a half-interest in the business to C. R. Bell and Alfred E. Green, who were to undertake the business management. At that time Owen, the paper's editor, retained his ownership stake. The paper was acquired by James P. Sullivan in June 1900, followed by Major H.W. Patton in June 1901. Patton formerly owned the Everett Independent.

In July 1903, Sam A. Perkins, owner of the Tacoma News and Tacoma Ledger, acquired the paper. He also bought the Aberdeen Sun, which was merged into the Bulletin. In July 1904, H. D. Crawford and Charles F. Cork purchased the Bulletin. That November, the two also bought The Olympian. In August 1905, their partnership ended, with Crawford taking full control of The Olympian and Cork becoming the sole proprietor and editor of the Bulletin. In 1906, Cork sold the Bulletin to a group of local prominent businessmen.

In May 1908, L. S. Humbarger sold the Bulletin for $15,000 to John F. Gilbert, publisher of a Seattle magazine. He planned to change its name to the Grays Harbor Journal. The ownership change went into effect on June 1, and by then Werner Andrew Rupp was reported as a co-owner with Gilbert, with the paper's name changed to the Aberdeen World. Rupp was a political reporter and editorial writer. Gilbert, was a gifted cartoonist. In January 1910, Gilbert retired from the paper and sold his stake to Rupp and moved to Seattle where he secured an interest in the Westerner magazine. Rupp was the paper's sole proprietor, editor and publisher for the next 53 years. He died in 1963.

The paper was inherited by Peter and Primrose Foelkner, and Lynn Cox. In 1967, they sold it to Richard LaFromboise, who owned The Chronicle in Centralia and Red Bluff Daily News in California. A year later LaFromboise died suddenly at age 36. He estate then sold The World to Donrey Media Group. On March 2, 1969, the paper became The Daily World.

In 2002, the company was renamed to Stephens Media. In 2014, The Daily World was sold to Sound Publishing, a subsidiary of Black Press. In 2020, the company suspended the paper's sister publications, The North Coast News in Ocean Shores and The Vidette in Montesano. In March 2024, Black Press was acquired by Carpenter Media Group.
