= Terrace Standard =

Community newspaper in Terrace, British Columbia

The Terrace Standard
- Type: Weekly community newspaper
- Owner: Black Press
- Publisher: Mary Kemmis (publishing duties, announced 2022)
- Founded: 1988
- Headquarters: Terrace, British Columbia, Canada
- Circulation: 7,233 (Thursday; as of October 2022)
- Website: www.terracestandard.com

The Terrace Standard is a community newspaper based in Terrace, British Columbia, serving northwest British Columbia. The paper was established in 1988 and is owned by Black Press.

== History ==
The Terrace Standard began publishing in 1988. Rod Link served as the paper's editor from its inception and added the title of publisher in 1991. He remained editor and publisher until his retirement in 2017.

Bert Husband joined the Terrace Standard in 2002 and was appointed publisher in 2017, succeeding Link, with the appointment announced by then-Black Press B.C. North president Lorie Williston. Husband also served as advertising sales manager as part of the appointment.

In late 2022, Black Press Media reported that Husband retired as publisher after five years at the helm (2017–2022). Sales duties were reported as transferring to Dan McGuire, while publishing duties were reported as being assumed by then-Black Press Media B.C. North president Mary Kemmis.

In 2022, the newspaper introduced a digital subscription program.

== Coverage ==
The Terrace Standard covers Terrace and communities across northwest British Columbia, including reporting relevant to the Nisga'a Nation. In an interview published by The Discourse, Rod Link discussed the constraints (newsroom size, budget, and travel distance) that influenced the paper's ability to cover Nisga'a legislative proceedings regularly.

== Audience and circulation ==
Black Press Media advertising media kits list print circulation, monthly page views, and combined social-media followers for the Terrace Standard:

- November 2020: circulation 8,759; 229,202 monthly page views; 10,766 social followers.
- March 2021 (page views as of February 2021): circulation 8,118 (Thursday); 247,921 monthly page views; 11,427 social followers.
- March 2022: circulation 7,749 (Thursday daily); 218,789 monthly page views; 11,989 social followers.
- October 2022: circulation 7,233 (Thursday); 237,090 monthly page views; 11,989 social followers.

Industry and association circulation documents have also reported figures for the Terrace Standard within BCYCNA “NX” circulation categories, including totals of 9,298 (2020), 8,759 (2021), and 8,759 (2023).

== Awards and recognition ==
The Terrace Standard and its staff have received recognition at the B.C. and Yukon community newspaper awards (Ma Murray Awards) and related industry competitions, including:

- 2001: Rod Link, bronze, Hard News Writing Award (BCYCNA awards).
- 2002: Jeff Nagel, silver, University College of the Cariboo Environment Writing Award; and gold, Certified General Accountants Association of British Columbia Business Writing Award.
- 2003: Sandra Stefanik, bronze, Canadian Bankers Association Ad Design Award (Black & White); and the Terrace Standard listed as bronze in the Terasen Newspaper Excellence category (circulation 6,500–12,499).
- 2005: Jeff Nagel, bronze, TELUS Neville Shanks Memorial Award for Historical Writing.
- 2007: Sandra Stefanik, silver, Canadian Bankers Association Ad Design Award (Spot Colour).
- 2018: Quinn Bender, gold, Spot News Photo Award (Under 25,000) (“Train versus pedestrian”).
- 2019: Quinn Bender, first place, Sports Photo Award (Under 25,000) (“Mountain Rush – Wild Descent Packhorse Race”). Black Press Media outlets also reported the same work as a nominee in 2019 awards coverage.
- 2022: Binny Paul, gold, Multimedia Feature Story Award (“On the Road to Indigenous-led food sovereignty in northwest B.C.”).
- 2023: Binny Paul, bronze, John Collinson Investigative Journalism Award; and Michael Bramadat-Wilcock, silver (Spot News Photo) and silver (Arts and Culture writing).

Rod Link has also been cited in industry contexts outside the newspaper's own awards, including work on a Canadian Association of Journalists discussion paper on “unpublishing,” authored with Kathy English and Tim Currie and submitted to the CAJ board in 2010.

== Affiliations ==
The Terrace Standard is a member of the British Columbia and Yukon Community Newspaper Association (BCYCNA). It is also listed as part of the Local News Collective.

== Notable people ==
- Rod Link — editor (1988–2017) and publisher (1991–2017). Link is also credited as editor of No Compromise, a memoir by labour leader John Jensen.

== See also ==
- List of newspapers in Canada
- Black Press
