= The Bellingham Business Journal =

- Type: Monthly newspaper
- Owner: Sound Publishing
- Founder: Al Raines
- Founded: November 1992
- Ceased publication: March 2020
- Language: English
- Headquarters: 1909 Cornwall Ave. Bellingham, WA 98225; United States
- Circulation: 4,000 monthly
- Website: bbjtoday.com

The Bellingham Business Journal was a monthly business publication based in Bellingham, Washington, from 1992 to 2020.

== History ==
The Bellingham Business Journal was founded by Al Raines in November 1992. Robin Yeager sold the paper to Wenatchee Business Journal owners Mike Cassidy and Jim Corcoran in 1994. The partners sold the business to Sun News Inc. in 2001. Sound Publishing purchased the paper in August 2007 and discontinued publishing the Bellingham Business Journal in March 2020, citing the COVID-19 pandemic.
