= Maple Ridge-Pitt Meadows News =

Canadian newspaper in British Columbia

Maple Ridge-Pitt Meadows News is a weekly newspaper serving Maple Ridge and Pitt Meadows, British Columbia. It publishes Friday and is owned by Black Press.

Maple Ridge-Pitt Meadows News

Type	Weekly newspaper
Owner(s)	Black Press
Publisher	Charlie Costa
Founded	1978
Circulation	30,118 (as of October 2022)
Website	mapleridgenews.com

== History ==
Founded in 1978 as a free-distribution paper called the Local News, The Maple Ridge-Pitt Meadows

Then-publisher Bob Long ran the paper on a 'shoestring' with significant input from local writers. In 1983 Gordon Robson took over the assets of the fledgling publication and then in 1985 sold the paper to Hacker Press, which eventually sold to Black Press. The paper then expanded from weekly to twice-weekly with the publication of The Sunday News, extending its reach westward into neighboring communities, laying the groundwork to launch successful sister papers, the Tri-City News and Burnaby/New Westminster News Leader.

== See also ==
- List of newspapers in Canada
- Daily Hive
