= Aldergrove Star =

Canadian newspaper in British Columbia

- Type: Weekly newspaper
- Owner(s): Black Press
- Publisher: Lisa Farquharson
- Editor: Ryan Uytdewilligen
- Founded: 16 October 1957
- Language: English
- Headquarters: Aldergrove, British Columbia, Canada
- Circulation: 6,483 (as of October 2022)
- Website: aldergrovestar.com

The Aldergrove Star is a weekly newspaper in Aldergrove, British Columbia. It publishes Friday and is owned by Black Press.

== History ==
The original title of the paper was Aldergrove Herald and it was started on 16 October 1957. From then on the paper was renamed many times: Aldergrove News (27 February 1958 – 30 April 1964); Central Fraser Valley Echo (6 May 1964 – 23 December 1964) and Central Valley Star (17 January 1967 – 5 February 1969). In 1969 the title of the paper was made Aldergrove Star.

Rudy and Inge Langmann acquired the paper in September 1966. As of 2020 the editor was Ryan Uytdewilligen.

== See also ==
- List of newspapers in Canada
