= Issaquah–Sammamish Reporter =

- Type: Weekly newspaper
- Owner(s): Sound Publishing
- Editor: Andy Hobbs
- General manager: William Shaw
- Staff writers: Cameron Sheppard
- Founded: 2007
- ISSN: 2638-3454
- OCLC number: 1048429039
- Website: issaquahreporter.com

The Issaquah–Sammamish Reporter is a United States community newspaper that covers Issaquah, Washington and Sammamish, Washington.

== History ==
The newspaper was established by Black Press as two separate titles in 2007: the Issaquah Reporter and the Sammamish Press. The Issaquah Reporter won first place for health reporting in the Society of Professional Journalists Northwest Excellence in Journalism competition for 2012. Its reporting has been sourced by the Washington Post and the Seattle Post-Intelligencer.

According to the newspaper, its 2017 circulation was 24,225.
