= Peninsula Daily News =

Newspaper in Port Angeles, Washington

- Type: Daily newspaper
- Owner(s): Sound Publishing
- Founder(s): A.A. Smith; E. B. Webster
- Publisher: Eran Kennedy
- Editor: Leah Leach
- Founded: 1916 (as Port Angeles Evening News)
- Headquarters: 305 West First Street, Port Angeles, Washington, U.S.
- Circulation: 8,087 (as of 2023)
- ISSN: 1050-7000
- OCLC number: 17023385
- Website: peninsuladailynews.com

The Peninsula Daily News is a daily newspaper printed Sundays through Fridays (for publication days of Monday through Saturday), covering the northern Olympic Peninsula in the state of Washington, United States. The paper's main offices are in Port Angeles, with news offices in Port Townsend and Sequim. It publishes separate editions for Clallam County and Jefferson County.

== History ==
In 1916, the Port Angeles Evening News was founded by A.A. Smith and E. B. Webster. At the time, the two also owned the Olympic-Leader and Tribune-Times. In 1919, Smith sold his interests to E B. Webster, William D. Welsh and John Schweitzer. E. B. Webster managed the paper until his death in 1936. His widow ran the business until her death in 1940. At that time ownership was passed to the couple's two daughters and son Charles Webster, who bought out his siblings in 1961.

In 1963, the Evening News made several innovations to expand of its service to nearby Forks and Sequim, with a dedicated correspondent in each city. Advertising revenue and circulation numbers increased, with the total circulation growing from 6,650 to 7,000. In 1969, Charles Webster died and ownership was transferred to his widow Esther Webster.

In 1971, sole-owner Esther Webster sold the paper to Longview Publishing Co., which owned the Longview Daily News. At that time the paper had a circulation around 10,000. In 1986, the company sold the paper and several other publications to Persis Corp. of Honolulu, Hawaii. In 1994, Horvitz Newspapers of Cleveland, Ohio acquired the News.

In 2011, the paper was sold to Sound Publishing, a subsidy of Black Press of Vancouver, Canada. The News' press was closed and 20 full- and part-time pressroom and mailroom workers were laid off. Printing was transferred to The Everett Herald. The same day, Sound Publishing also bought a competing weekly newspaper publisher, Olympic View Publishing Company, owner of the Sequim Gazette and Forks Forum, along with local real estate publications.
