= Prince Rupert Daily News =

Print Rupert Daily News
- Type: Daily newspaper
- Founded: 1911
- Ceased publication: July 16, 2010
- Headquarters: Prince Rupert, British Columbia, Canada
- ISSN: 1186-4877

The Prince Rupert Daily News was a daily newspaper in Prince Rupert, British Columbia, closed in 2010. Its last owner was Black Press, the largest publisher of weekly newspapers in British Columbia, which owns the competing weekly Northern View.

The Daily News traced its history back to 1911, having also published under the names Evening Empire and Prince Rupert Optimist.

By 2010 the newspaper had only approximately 750 subscribers, and was in a financial decline, similar to the struggling port community it covered.

Black Press purchased the Daily News in July 2010, as part of a larger deal that saw Glacier Media sell several of its British Columbia papers, mostly weeklies, to Black. Former Black executive Don Kendall bought Glacier dailies in Cranbrook and Kimberley as part of the same deal, remarking that Black "wasn't as interested in some titles – Cranbrook, Kimberley, Nelson, and Prince Rupert – but Glacier was only selling the papers as a block."

Black did purchase the Nelson Daily News and Prince Rupert Daily News in 2010, and ended up closing them days later. It already owned competing weeklies in both markets, the Nelson Star and The Northern View. Rick O'Connor, Black's chief operating officer, said the Nelson and Prince Rupert newspapers, along with two other weeklies shuttered the same day, had lost $1 million in the past year.

Black purchased the Daily Townsman and Daily Bulletin from Kendall a year later, promising that both "will continue to run under their current business plan and we anticipate few changes."

== See also ==
- Nelson Daily News
- List of newspapers in Canada
