= Lake District News =

Canadian newspaper in British Columbia

- Type: Weekly newspaper
- Owner(s): Black Press
- Publisher: Laura Blackwell
- Editor: Flavio Nienow
- Language: English
- Headquarters: Burns Lake, British Columbia, Canada
- Circulation: 834 (as of October 2022)
- Website: ldnews.net

The Lake District News is a weekly newspaper in Burns Lake, British Columbia. It publishes Wednesday and is owned by Black Press.

== See also ==
- List of newspapers in Canada
