= Honolulu Star-Bulletin =

Daily newspaper

The Honolulu Star-Bulletin

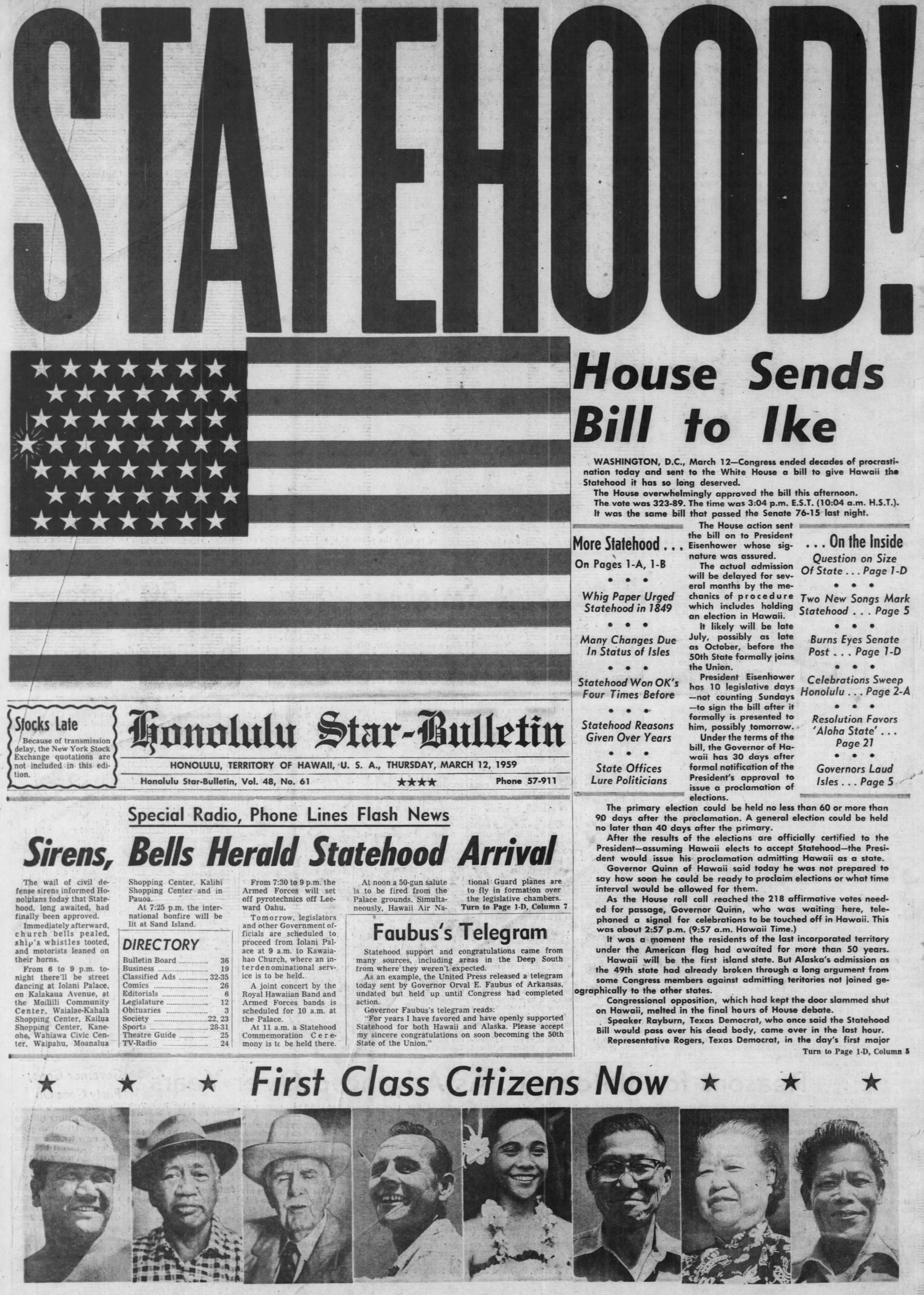
- Front page on March 12, 1959, announcing the Hawaii Admission Act
- Type: Daily newspaper
- Format: Broadsheet (1912–2009); Tabloid (2009–2010)
- Owner: Oahu Publications Inc. (Subsidiary of Black Press Ltd.)
- Publisher: Dennis Francis
- Editor: Frank Bridgewater
- Founded: 1912 (Merger between Evening Bulletin and Hawaiian Star)
- Ceased publication: June 6, 2010 (Merged into Honolulu Star-Advertiser)
- Headquarters: Restaurant Row, 7 Waterfront Plaza, Suite 210; 500 Ala Moana, Honolulu, Hawaii 96813. US
- Circulation: 64,073 Morning; 60,158 Sunday (as of 2007)
- ISSN: 2326-1137
- OCLC number: 8807359
- Website: archives.starbulletin.com

Honolulu Star-Bulletin logo in 2001

former logo

The Honolulu Star-Bulletin was a daily newspaper based in Honolulu, Hawaii, United States. At the time publication ceased on June 6, 2010, it was the second largest daily newspaper in the state of Hawaiʻi (after the Honolulu Advertiser).

The Honolulu Star-Bulletin, along with a sister publication called MidWeek, was owned by Black Press of Victoria, British Columbia, Canada and administered by a council of local Hawaii investors. The daily merged with the Advertiser on June 7, 2010, to form the Honolulu Star-Advertiser, after Black Press's attempts to find a buyer fell through.

== History ==
=== Farrington Era ===
The Honolulu Star-Bulletin traces its roots to the February 1, 1882, founding of the Evening Bulletin by J. W. Robertson and Company. In 1912, it merged with the Hawaiian Star to become the Honolulu Star-Bulletin. Wallace Rider Farrington, who later became territorial governor of Hawaii, was the editor of the newspaper from 1898 and the president and publisher from 1912 until his death. His son Joseph Rider Farrington succeeded him and served as president and publisher until his own death in 1954. From 1962 it was owned by a local group of investors led by Elizabeth P. Farrington and Chinn Ho and operated under a joint operating agreement with the Honolulu Advertiser that allowed the two papers to use the same printing facilities and sales personnel (the Hawaii Newspaper Agency) while maintaining separate fully competitive editorial staffs and providing Honolulu with two distinct editorial "voices."

=== Gannett Era ===
Gannett Pacific Corporation, a subsidiary of Gannett Corporation, purchased the Honolulu Star-Bulletin in 1971 under the terms of the existing joint operating agreement. The terms of the joint operating agreement did not allow one company to own both newspapers, so in 1992, Gannett sold the Honolulu Star-Bulletin to Liberty Newspapers so that it could purchase the Honolulu Advertiser. The Honolulu Star-Bulletin's circulation was allowed to decline thereafter and staffing reduced.

On September 16, 1999, Liberty Newspapers announced that it planned to close the Honolulu Star-Bulletin the following month. The decision was met with fierce resistance in the community and lawsuits were filed against Liberty and Gannett by the state and by concerned citizens' groups. The shutdown was postponed with an injunction by a federal district judge two weeks before the scheduled date of closure.

=== Black era ===
In April 2000, Liberty Newspapers offered the Honolulu Star-Bulletin for sale. The action once again threatened the closure of the publication, but in November of that year, Canadian publishing magnate David Black announced his intent to purchase the Honolulu Star-Bulletin. When the purchase was finalized in 2001, the joint operating agreement came to an end and Black moved the paper's administration and editorial offices to new headquarters in Restaurant Row near Honolulu Harbor. The newspaper was printed in Kaneohe, on the presses of the Star-Bulletin's sister publication, MidWeek. (Black had purchased MidWeek shortly before the Star-Bulletin deal was closed—and at a time when no one in the local business community was aware that it was for sale.)

On April 13, 2009, The Star-Bulletin made the conversion from a broadsheet to a tabloid format in an effort to retain its readership base, even though the move resulted in the layoff of 17 editorial staffers (about 20% of its unionized workforce). This was done to save costs. However, the format did not help as it continued to lose both money and readership. At the same time, Gannett was looking into selling the Advertiser as the company decided that it did not fit in with Gannett's long-term strategy. This move would lead to Black Press pursuing a deal that would result in buying the Advertiser, a more profitable paper with a daily circulation of 115,000, even though the Star-Bulletin itself was losing money and had a daily circulation of 37,000.

=== Merger ===
Star-Bulletin vending machines being hauled away on the last day of circulation

On February 25, 2010, Black Press purchased only the "physical assets" of The Honolulu Advertiser. As part of the deal to acquire the Advertiser, Black Press agreed to place the Star-Bulletin on the selling block. If no buyer came forward by March 29, 2010, Black Press would start making preparations to operate both papers through a transitional management team and then combine the two dailies into one.

On March 30, 2010, three parties came forward with offers to buy the Star-Bulletin, but a month later on April 27, 2010, the bids were rejected because their bid for the Star-Bulletin was below the minimum, liquidation price, resulting in Black Press cancelling any sale and proceeding with transition plans, which came on the same day that they were approved to take over the Advertiser by the Department of Justice.

On May 3, 2010, a new company set by Black Press, HA Management, took over the operations of Advertiser while also overseeing the Star-Bulletin during a 30- to 60-day transition period, in which both papers merged into one daily, The Honolulu Star-Advertiser. The merger took place on June 7, 2010. Existing Advertiser employment ceased. The Star-Bulletin published its final issue as a tabloid on June 6, 2010 before returning to a broadsheet paper under the merger.

== Key dates ==
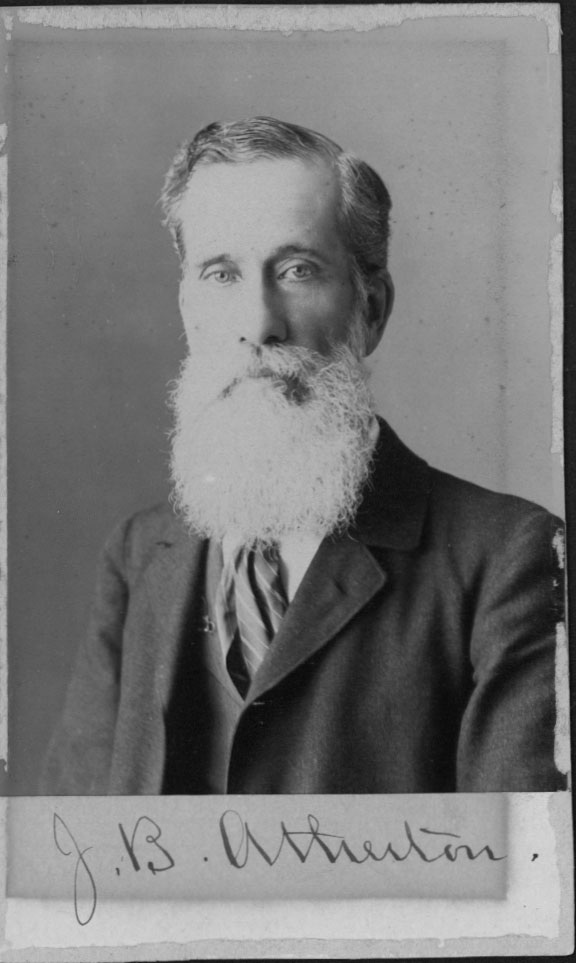
Joseph Ballard Atherton

- February 1, 1882: Henry Martyn Whitney, who had founded the Pacific Commercial Advertiser in 1856, began placing a "Daily Bulletin" in the window of James Robertson's Honolulu waterfront stationery store. Robertson bought the concept from Whitney and hired him as editor.
- March 28, 1893: Two months after Queen Liliuokalani was overthrown, businessman Joseph Ballard Atherton founded the Hawaiian Star as a mouthpiece for the provisional government.
- July 4, 1894: The Republic of Hawaii was established, and Whitney's successor as Advertiser editor was New Englander Wallace Rider Farrington. While Farrington edited the Advertiser, it was purchased by Lorrin Thurston. Disagreeing with Advertiser policies, Farrington became editor of the competing Daily Bulletin.
- July 1, 1912: The Hawaiian Star and Evening Bulletin merged to form the Honolulu Star-Bulletin. Riley Allen became editor. Joseph Ballard Atherton and sons Charles H. and Frank Cooke became owners of the Star-Bulletin, the latter becoming the first president. Wallace Farrington became vice president and general business manager.
- 1925: The Honolulu Star-Bulletin bought the Tribune-Herald in Hilo, operating it from afar until the Big Island paper was divested to Donrey Media in 1964.
- July 6, 1929: After Wallace Farrington completed eight years as territorial governor, Frank Cooke Atherton turned control of the Star-Bulletin over to Farrington, who was named president and publisher.

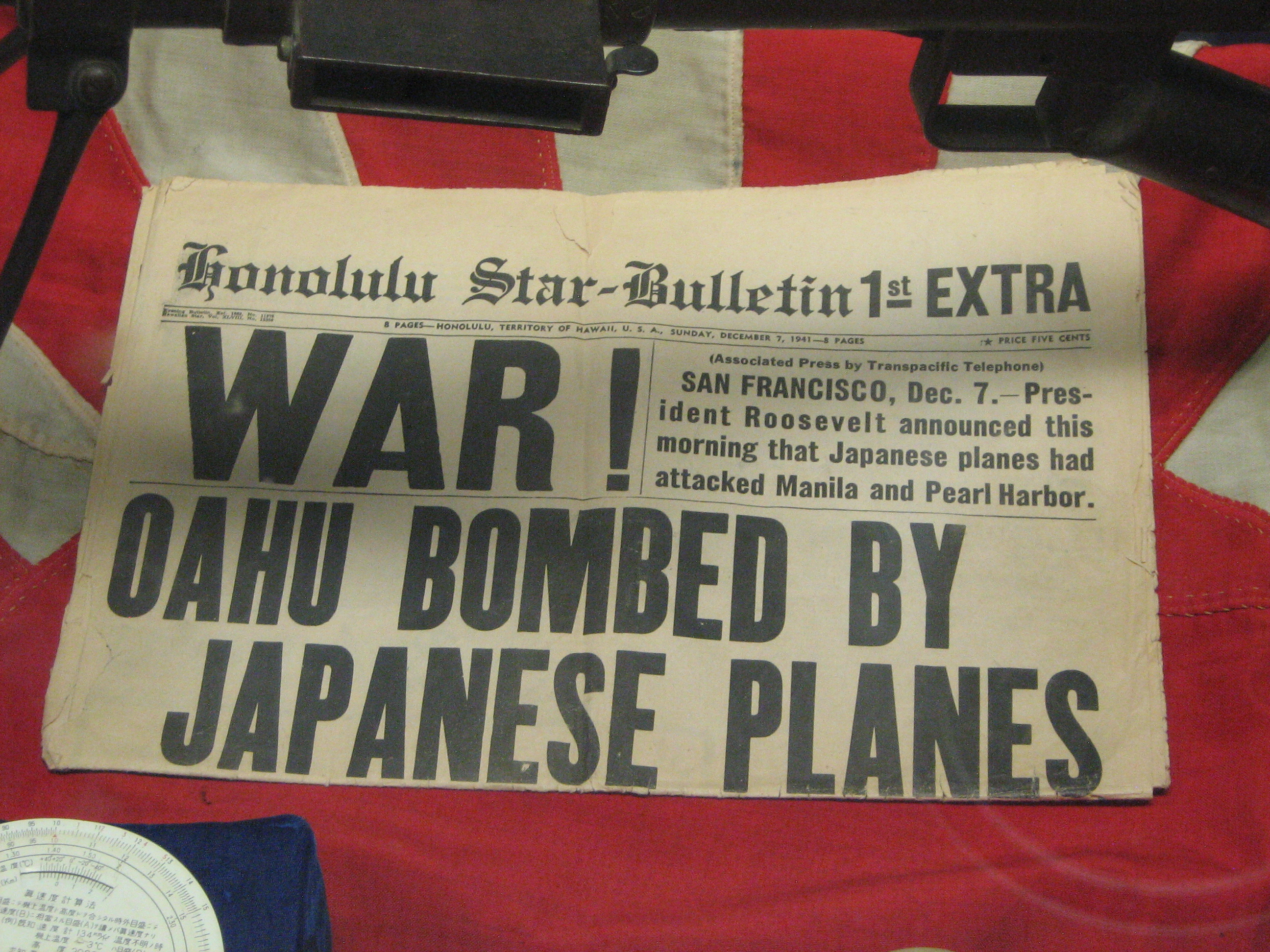
Honolulu Star-Bulletin 1st extra edition. December 7, 1941

- December 7, 1941: On the day of the attack on Pearl Harbor, the Star-Bulletin published its most famous extra, as Editor Riley Allen and staff scrambled to print the first paper in the world with news of the assault. Extras were being sold on the street within three hours.
- November 3, 1942: Joseph Farrington, Star-Bulletin president and general manager, was elected nonvoting Hawaii delegate to Congress. He was re-elected in 1944, 1946, 1948, 1950 and 1952.
- Bill Ewing, a Star-Bulletin editor, was credited with creating the slang term "SeaBee" for the U.S. Navy's construction battalions.
- October 24, 1944: Wartime martial law ended in Hawaii. The Star-Bulletin strongly opposed martial law from its inception shortly after the Pearl Harbor attack.
- December 1, 1952: The Honolulu Star-Bulletin partnered with radio man J. Howard Worrell to open KGMB-TV, Hawaii's first television station, airing for the first time.
- April 17, 1953: In response to a statement by Mississippi's Sen. James Eastland that Hawaii was dominated by Communists and would, if granted statehood, send representatives of Moscow to Congress, the Star-Bulletin devoted most of its front page, all of page 2 and part of page 3 to listing the names of Hawaii's dead, wounded, missing and prisoners in the 1950–53 Korean War.
- March 9, 1957: Star-Bulletin reporter Sarah Park, 29, died when a small plane piloted by Hawaii advertising executive Paul Beam crashed into the sea just off Laie Point while covering the tsunami arrival following the 1957 Andreanof Islands earthquake. Beam, 42, died less than 24 hours later. Star-Bulletin photographer Jack Matsumoto survived the crash with injuries, eventually returning to work.
- 1959: The Star-Bulletin publishes its statehood editions. The picture of Chester Kahapea hawking statehood editions two days before his 13th birthday appears March 13. The picture, snapped by Murray Befeler of Photo Hawaii, is picked up by such newspapers as the New York Times and New York Daily News.
- July 22, 1960: Riley Allen steps down as editor after 48 years. Star-Bulletin circulation during his career rose from about 4,000 in 1912 to 104,000 in 1960. He had overseen coverage of two of Hawaii's biggest stories – the Pearl Harbor attack and statehood.
- 1961: A "hui" including Chinn Ho, Joseph Ballard Atherton, Alexander Atherton, William H. Hill and John T. Waterhouse forms to buy the Star-Bulletin from the Farrington Estate.
- June 1, 1962: The Star-Bulletin and its morning rival, the Honolulu Advertiser, set up a third company, the Hawaii Newspaper Agency, under a joint operating agreement to handle non-newsroom functions of both papers. The Sunday editions of both papers are combined.
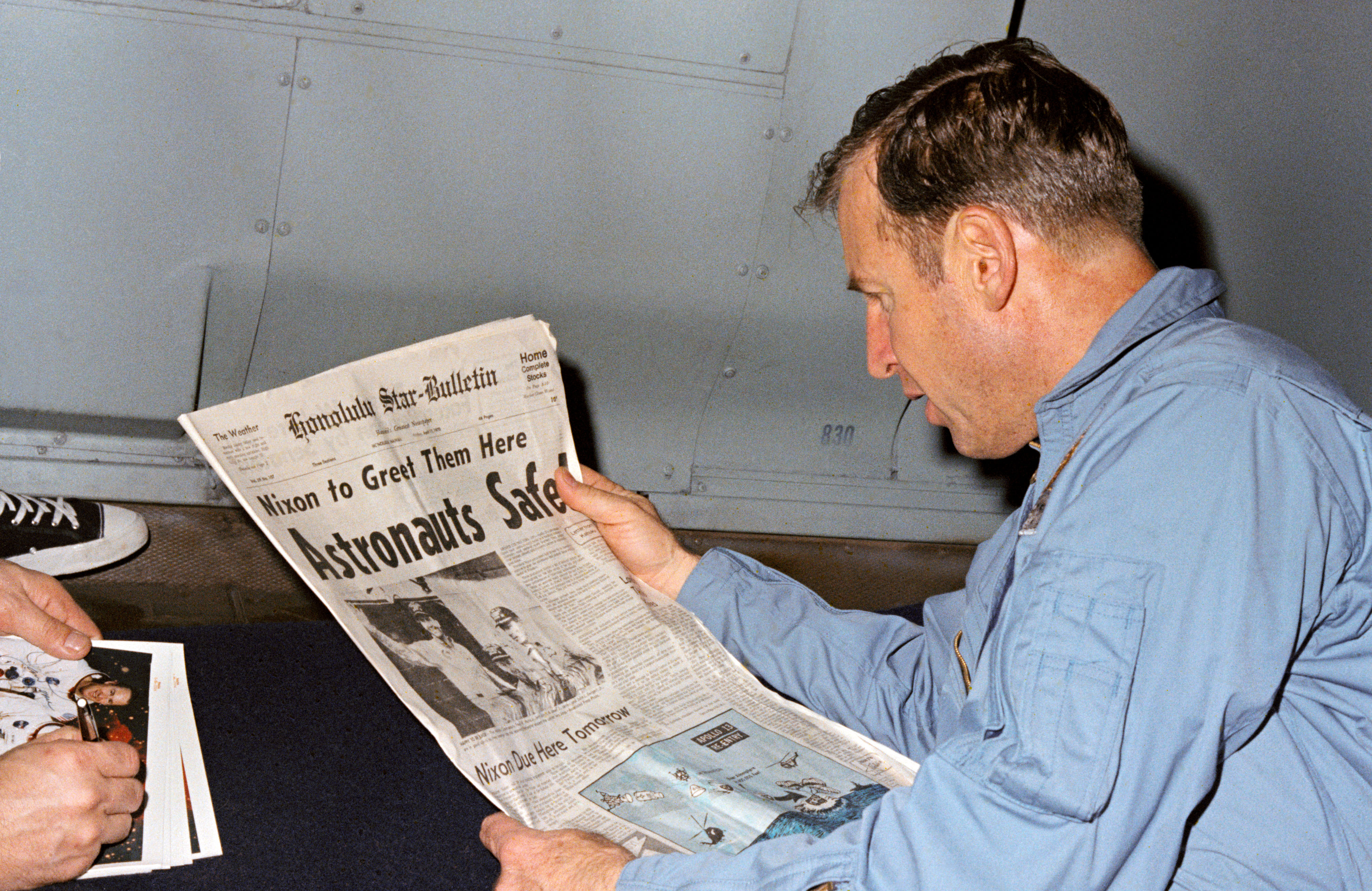
- Astronaut Jim Lovell reading the Star-Bulletin's report of his crew's safe return after the Apollo 13 mission
  Aug. 2, 1971: Gannett Co. Inc. announces it is purchasing the Star-Bulletin, which now has a circulation of 128,000.
- Jan. 7, 1993: Gannett announces it has reached an agreement to sell the Star-Bulletin to Rupert Phillips' Liberty Newspapers Limited Partnership in a move that will allow Gannett to complete its acquisition of the Honolulu Advertiser. Star-Bulletin circulation is 88,000.
- March 18, 1996, the Star-Bulletin debuted http://starbulletin.com, the first regularly-published online newspaper in Hawaii. Webmaster Blaine Fergerstrom was hired March 3, 1996 from Milici Valenti Ng Pack Advertising as a staff artist and launched the site two weeks later. He published Monday–Friday editions, mostly solo, for two-and-a-half years. In 1999, the Honolulu Advertiser announced their competing online edition, thehonoluluadvertiser.com, and hired 12 people to staff their effort. The Star-Bulletin responded by doubling the size of the starbulletin.com staff, to two, by adding Assistant Webmaster Kenneth Andrade, who moved over from Assistant Editor of the Business Section of the paper. The online edition subsequently published seven days a week. starbulletin.com went on to receive major awards from Editor and Publisher Magazine, American Journalism Review, (which ranked starbulletin.com as 19th in the world behind the Christian Science Monitor and ahead of the Chicago Tribune), Hawaii Publishers Association, and the Arizona State University Cronkite School of Journalism, which awarded starbulletin.com with a "Best of the West" award in 2000 for the sites groundbreaking online video presentations.
- August 9, 1997: The Star-Bulletin publishes the "Broken Trust" essay by five community leaders critical of Bishop Estate trustees. This leads to investigations, court actions and statewide soul-searching to bring about corrective action. The $1 million-a-year Bishop Estate trustees are eventually toppled and reforms are set in motion.
- September 16, 1999: Liberty Newspapers announces it will shut down the Star-Bulletin on October 30 because of better investment opportunities on the mainland. Circulation is 67,124. A group of community members called "Save Our Star-Bulletin" bands together in an effort to keep the paper alive.
- October 13, 1999: District Judge Alan Cooke Kay issues a preliminary injunction in federal court keeping Gannett Co. and Liberty Newspapers from taking further steps to close the Star-Bulletin. On November 9 the court approves Black Press Ltd.'s purchase of the Star-Bulletin. In December Black Press owner David Black announces he is purchasing RFD Publications, which owns MidWeek.
- November 9, 2000: The federal court approved Black Press Ltd.'s purchase of the Star-Bulletin. The order comes after Black Press reached agreement with Liberty and Gannett over the terms of the Star-Bulletin takeover.
- March 15, 2001: The Star-Bulletin moves to Waterfront Plaza offices, launching its inaugural edition and new morning issue under Oahu Publications, a new local company formed by David Black. Don Kendall is named publisher. The paper is published on the MidWeek press in Kaneohe.
- June 3, 2004: Dennis Francis was named president of Oahu Publications Inc. and publisher of the Honolulu Star-Bulletin and Glenn Zuehls was named vice president of advertising.
- February 25, 2010: An agreement for Oahu Publications Inc., which owns the Star-Bulletin and MidWeek, to acquire its longtime rival, The Honolulu Advertiser, is announced in simultaneous meetings in both newsrooms.
- June 6, 2010: At the conclusion of the transition, Oahu Publications merges both newspapers into the Honolulu Star-Advertiser, under publisher Dennis Francis.

== Notable reporters ==
- Ah Jook Ku
- Peggy Hull
