= Cranbrook Townsman =

Canadian newspaper in British Columbia

- Type: Weekly newspaper
- Format: Compact
- Owner(s): Black Press
- Publisher: Karen Johnston
- Editor: Barry Coulter
- Founded: 1920s, as Cranbrook Courier
- Language: English
- Headquarters: 822 Cranbrook Street North; Cranbrook, British Columbia; V1C 3R9
- Circulation: 1,254 (as of October 2022)
- Website: cranbrooktownsman.com

The Cranbrook Townsman is a weekly newspaper in Cranbrook, British Columbia, Canada. It publishes Tuesday and is owned by Black Press.

== History ==
The Townsman is the paper of record for Cranbrook. During the COVID-19 pandemic it publishes once a week, on Tuesday. Its Thursday product, the Kootenay News Advertiser, distributes to several outlying communities in the East Kootenay region. Originally a weekly newspaper, it has published daily since 1946. In 2016, it began publishing three times a week.

Don Kendall, a former executive at Black Press, purchased the Townsman and Kimberly Daily Bulletin in July 2010, as part of a larger deal that saw Glacier Media sell several of its British Columbia papers to Black. At the time, Kendall said Black "wasn't as interested in some titles – Cranbrook, Kimberley, Nelson, and Prince Rupert – but Glacier was only selling the papers as a block."

Black did purchase the Nelson Daily News and Prince Rupert Daily News in 2010, and ended up closing them days later. It already owned competing weeklies in both Nelson and Prince Rupert.

Although it also owns a competing weekly in Cranbrook, the Kootenay Advertiser, Black purchased the Townsman and Daily Bulletin from Kendall a year later, promising that both the weekly and the dailies "will continue to run under their current business plan and we anticipate few changes."

All of Black's community newspapers in the East Kootenay region are printed on the Townsman's presses.

== See also ==
- Kimberley Daily Bulletin
- List of newspapers in Canada
