= Ah Jook Ku =

American journalist (1910–2007)

Ah Jook Ku (April 24, 1910 – August 6, 2007) was an American journalist, writer, media advocate and public relations practitioner. She was the first Asian American reporter for the Associated Press, and the first Asian American female reporter for the Honolulu Star-Bulletin newspaper. Her nickname was "Jookie."

In the 1940s she covered life in China and the government of President Chiang Kai-Shek. But in later years she was regarded as the "guiding force" of the media council, said former Chairman Richard S. Miller. Ku was known as a feisty advocate for freedom of information and journalism standards.

== Early life ==
Ah Jook Ku was born on April 24, 1910, in Kailua, Hawaii. She was one of 15 children in her family. She and her family grew up on the 'Ewa Plantation (Ewa Beach) in Hawaii, where her father worked as a luna (boss). Ku was Chinese American, a descendant of early Chinese immigrants to Hawaii.

She attended Mid-Pacific Institute on a scholarship. Ku served as a high school reporter for the Honolulu Star-Bulletin while at Mid-Pacific. She earned a degree in education from the University of Hawaiʻi in 1933. Following graduation from college, Ku graduated from the University of Missouri School of Journalism in 1935, also on a scholarship. She was only the third woman of Chinese descent to graduate from the School of Journalism. Additionally, she became only the second Hawaiian "exchange student" to graduate from the journalism school.

Ku was often involved with various university journalism clubs while in college. She often appeared on campus radio broadcasts and before community groups as an advocate for Hawaii.

Despite her academic achievements, Ku's parents believed that girls did not deserve an education. She often recounted a story about how her father once considered selling her for a single bag of rice. Ku commented on her father's attitude towards education, "the head of the family wasn't eager about educating women."

== Career ==
Ah Jook Ku returned to Honolulu following her graduation from the University of Missouri. She began work at the Honolulu Star-Bulletin, where she had previously worked as a high school correspondent. Ku was hired by the Associated Press in 1943 during World War II, becoming the AP's first Asian American reporter. She remained as a reporter for the AP wire service until 1946.

Ku left Hawaii for China in 1948 aboard the Pacific maiden voyage of the SS President Cleveland. She took a job at the information office of the Nationalist Chinese government of Chiang Kai-shek as an English language editor. She was based in Nanking, China, for just 18 months at the position before the 1949 Communist Revolution forced her to return to Hawaii.

Upon her return to Hawaii from China, Ku began working in the growing field of public relations. She worked at a number of organizations including the Hawaiian branch of the Salvation Army, the Hawaiian Chamber of Commerce and the Hawaii Employers Council. She ultimately worked as an information specialist for the Hawaii state Department of Education before her retirement in 1975.

== Advocacy ==
Ah Jook Ku became executive director of the Honolulu Community Media Council in 1975, the same year that she retired from the Department of Education. The council had been founded as a nonprofit volunteer group in 1970. The group was created in response to a ban on reporters from the Honolulu Star-Bulletin and Honolulu Advertiser from press conferences by then Honolulu mayor Frank Fasi. Its purpose was to promote accurate and ethical journalism within Hawaii, support First Amendment rights and seek transparent public access to government information. Ku remained involved with the Council as executive director for 25 years. Ku was especially active in the 1980s, fighting on behalf of Hawaii's sunshine law. She retired from the Council in 2002.

Ku was an original founding member of a group called "Save Our Star-Bulletin" in the late 1990s. The group was formed in response by an attempt by Liberty Newspapers, the former owner of the Honolulu Star-Bulletin, to shut down the newspaper in 1999. The "Save Our Star-Bulletin" sued Liberty Newspapers in U.S. federal court and successfully blocked the closure of the Star-Bulletin.

== Awards ==
Ah Jook Ku was awarded the Fletcher Knebel Award for outstanding contributions to journalism by the Honolulu Community Media Council in 2002.

== Books ==
- The Chinese in Hawaii (1961)

== Death ==
Ah Jook Ku died on Monday, August 6, 2007, at Leahi Hospital in Honolulu. She was 97 years old. She was survived by a sister, Yuk Jun Joseph, and several nieces and nephews. Her funeral was held on August 21, 2007.
