= Red Deer Advocate =

Daily newspaper in Red Deer, Alberta, Canada

- Type: Daily newspaper
- Format: Tabloid
- Owner(s): Black Press
- Founded: 1901 as Red Deer Echo
- Headquarters: 2950 Bremner Avenue; Red Deer, Alberta; T4R 1M9
- Circulation: 5,579 (as of October 2022)
- ISSN: 0832-4379
- Website: reddeeradvocate.com

The Red Deer Advocate is a twice-weekly newspaper in Red Deer, Alberta, Canada. It publishes Wednesday and Saturday and is owned by Black Press.

== History ==
The newspaper was first established in 1901 as the Red Deer Echo, changing its name to Alberta Advocate in 1903 and Red Deer Advocate in 1906. Originally it was a weekly newspaper issued on Fridays.

In 2016, the paper moved to five days a week, dropping the Monday edition, along with the slogan "Central Alberta's Daily Newspaper".

In 2019, 25 people were laid off from the Red Deer Advocate. The paper's pressroom and mailroom were closed July 1 and those operations were moved to other Black Press operations. The weekly newspaper Red Deer Express also ceased.

In 2024, Advocate moved from publishing a print edition from five days a week to two on Wednesdays and Saturdays.

== Weekly supplements ==
The newspaper publishes weekly supplements called Central Alberta Life (for rural communities), and owns eleven weekly newspapers covering outlying Alberta towns: the Lacombe Express (Lacombe), Pipestone Flyer (Pipestone), Ponoka News (Ponoka), Rimbey Review (Rimbey), Stettler Independent (Stettler) and Sylvan Lake News (Sylvan Lake). In addition to printing its own weekly and daily products, the Advocate presses also print, by contract, several other newspapers covering communities in Alberta, British Columbia, Saskatchewan and Manitoba.

== See also ==
- List of newspapers in Canada
