= Kimberley Bulletin =

Canadian newspaper in British Columbia

- Type: Weekly newspaper
- Format: Compact
- Owner: Black Press
- Publisher: Karen Johnston
- Editor: Carolyn Grant
- Founded: 1932
- Language: English
- Headquarters: 335 Spokane Street, Kimberley, British Columbia, Canada
- Circulation: 794 (as of October 2022)
- Website: kimberleybulletin.com

The Kimberley Bulletin is a weekly newspaper in Kimberley, British Columbia. It publishes Wednesday and is owned by Black Press.

== History ==
The Bulletin used to publish Mondays through Fridays, billing itself as "Canada's smallest daily newspaper".

Don Kendall, a former executive at Black Press, purchased the Daily Bulletin and Cranbrook Daily Townsman in July 2010, as part of a larger deal that saw Glacier Media sell several of its British Columbia papers to Black. At the time, Kendall said Black "wasn't as interested in some titles – Cranbrook, Kimberley, Nelson, and Prince Rupert – but Glacier was only selling the papers as a block."

Black did purchase the Nelson Daily News and Prince Rupert Daily News in 2010, and ended up closing them days later. It already owned competing weeklies in both Nelson and Prince Rupert.

Although it also owns a competing weekly in Cranbrook, the Kootenay Advertiser, Black purchased the Daily Townsman and Daily Bulletin from Kendall a year later, promising that both the weekly and the dailies "will continue to run under their current business plan and we anticipate few changes".

== See also ==
- Cranbrook Daily Townsman
- List of newspapers in Canada
