= The Abbotsford News =

Canadian local newspaper in British Columbia

Abbotsford News
- Type: Weekly newspaper
- Owner: Black Press
- Founder: John A. Bates
- Publisher: Steve Scott
- Editor: Kevin Mills
- Founded: 1906
- Language: English
- Headquarters: Abbotsford, British Columbia; V2S 2H5
- Circulation: 17,850 (as of July 2026)
- Website: abbynews.com

The Abbotsford News is a weekly newspaper in Abbotsford, British Columbia. It publishes Thursday and is owned by Black Press.

== History ==
The News claims to be one of the first community newspapers in the province due to its roots from the Abbotsford Post established in 1906 by Mission publisher John A. Bates. The Post was sold in 1922 and changed its name to Abbotsford, Sumas and Matsqui News. Other sales to new owners occurred in 1938 and 1962. Black Press purchased The News in 1997.

The News competed against the Abbotsford Times until Black Press purchased the Times from Glacier Media and announced in December 2013 that it would cease publishing the Times due to revenue losses and disinterest in staff at the Times transferring to Black Press. No new publishing has been as of date.

== See also ==
- List of newspapers in Canada
