= MidWeek =

Weekly Hawaiian tabloid periodical

- Owner: Oahu Publications
- Publisher: Dennis Francis
- Editor: Bill Mossman
- Managing editor: Nicole Monton
- Founded: 1984
- Headquarters: 500 Ala Moana Blvd., Suite 7-500 Honolulu, HI. 96813.
- Circulation: 250,338 (as of 2021)
- Website: https://www.midweek.com/

MidWeek is a weekly United States tabloid shopper and advertisement periodical published Wednesday in Honolulu, Hawaii and distributed throughout the islands of Oahu and Kauai. It is owned by Black Press and is a sister publication of the Honolulu Star-Advertiser.

== History ==
The shopper started in 1984 to provide advertisers with an alternative way to reach more customers. Publisher Ken Berry helped secure deals with Safeway and Pay ‘n Save to advertise with the fledgling publication. Berry sought out cover stories and columnists that would increase readership.

The first issue of MidWeek was published on July 18, 1984 and featured local newscaster Joe Moore on the cover.

The first MidWeek editor was Cheryl Deep. 1984 to 1987, followed by Vera Benedek, 1987 to 1994, and Don Chapman who joined the newspaper in November 1994. Ken Berry left MidWeek in 2001 and associate publisher, Ron Nagasawa, who has been with the company since 1984, stepped up to the publisher position. On March 15, 2001, MidWeek was sold by its owner Sam Newhouse (RFD Publications) to David Black (Black Press), then became known as MidWeek Printing & Oahu Publications, Inc. then bought/merged with the local daily newspaper, Honolulu Star-Bulletin.

Midweek's early popularity was owed in large part to its weekly mail-in sweepstakes with cash prizes in the hundreds of dollars and grocery shopping sprees being award to entrants.

MidWeek added on a Friday/weekend edition in 2005 and celebrated its 25th year of publication in 2009. It is mailed to all homes on the Island of Oahu and has an approximate readership of 500,000.

== Columnists ==
The first nationally syndicated columnists to join the MidWeek line-up were Andy Rooney, movie critic Roger Ebert, Dr. Joyce Brothers, Wall Street guru Louis Rukeyser, the father of American cooking James Beard. The first local columnists to join up were Larry Price, Bob Jones and Eddie Sherman. Current local MidWeek Columnists are Bob Jones, Larry Price, Dan Boylan, Steve Murray (Hot Air - Sports) Rick Hamada, Susan Page, Jerry Coffee, David S. Chang (The Art of Thinking Smart), Alison Young (Click Chick - technology), Pamela Young, Diana Helfand (recipes), Bob Hogue, Tom Moffatt and Ron Nagasawa.

== Features ==
In addition to regular features and columns, Midweek has also run a set of regular features. Television listings have been featured since the magazine's first issue. The feature "Focus On Oahu" shows pictures people who live on Oahu enjoying their lives.

Over the years, MidWeek included more features to showcase people in Hawaii. "Newsmaker" provides an up-close look at people who are making news. "Old Friends" features updates on people who have appeared on the magazine's cover in the past. "Good Neighbor" salutes people who devote part of their time volunteering to help other people in the community. Other popular features are the color photo spread "Honolulu Pa’ina", and "Hotshots". The magazine's official website was launched in August 1996.

This Honolulu Hawaii weekly publication featured a person in the community of Hawaii on the cover.
