= Yukon News =

Canadian newspaper in Whitehorse, Yukon

- Type: Weekly newspaper
- Owner: Black Press
- Publisher: Kevin Ceniza
- Editor: Jim Elliot
- Founded: 1960
- Headquarters: Whitehorse, Yukon
- Circulation: 3,317 Wednesday; 4,267 Friday (as of October 2022)
- Website: yukon-news.com

Yukon News is a weekly newspaper in Whitehorse, Yukon. It publishes on Friday and is owned by Black Press.

== History ==
The newspaper was founded in 1960. Until the late 1970s, it was printed weekly until the late 1970s. It currently prints two times a week. The paper was originally printed in broadsheet format, but switched to tabloid format during the 1980s.

The Yukon News was bought in August 2013 by Black Press. Its previous owner was Stephen Robertson. Jim Elliot is the paper's editor.

In 2026, the paper eliminated its Wednesday edition.
