= Bainbridge Island Review =

Newspaper in Washington state, US

- Type: Weekly newspaper
- Format: Broadsheet
- Owner: Sound Publishing
- Editor: Tyler Shuey
- Staff writers: Joshua Kornfeld; Molly Hetherwick; Luke Caputo
- Founded: 1925
- Language: English
- Circulation: 1,778 (as of 2023)
- ISSN: 1053-2889
- OCLC number: 18928542
- Website: bainbridgereview.com

The Bainbridge Island Review is a weekly newspaper distributed in Bainbridge Island, Washington. The Review is primarily focused on Bainbridge Island and its surrounding communities.

== History ==
Much of the paper's early history was lost after a fire in the 1940s and another in 1962 destroyed much of the archive. It is known that at least eight other newspapers opened and closed in the time before the Bainbridge Island Review. Some reports say as many as 40 papers have been published on Bainbridge Island over the years. The Golden West of Port Blakely began in 1895, the weekly Bainbridge Island Gazette and monthly Eagle Harbor Pilot in 1912, and the Bainbridge Island Beacon of Winslow in 1922. A. D. Creed suspended publication of the Beacon in November 1924.

That winter students at a Bainbridge high school started the Review. R.M. Hitchcock of Rolling Bay purchased the paper and was assisted by Frances Martin Niemeyer. The paper soon ceased but was relaunched under new ownership in May 1925. Frances Niemeyer was at the helm, now joined by her husband Henry W. L. Niemeyer. The paper's office was at some point relocated from Rolling Bay to Port Blakely and printing presses were installed on that site. The plant was moved to Pleasant Beach on Feb. 7, 1927. Niemeyer's husband, who was a major in United States Army Quartermaster Corps, died suddenly on Jan. 7, 1936, of a paralytic stroke. He was 56.

She then managed the Review on her own until selling it in July 1940 to lawyer Laurance A. Peters, his wife Claire Taft Peters, along with teacher Mildred Logg Woodward. Niemeyer stayed on for three months to assist the new owners before retiring. She wretched her hip and injured her leg helping the trio put out their first paper and became bedridden for at least a week. By September 1941, Mildred Woodward was the paper's sole owner and assisted by Elizabeth Shotwell. Her husband Walter C. Woodward Jr. soon joined her in running the Review. Walt Woodward previously worked as a reporter for The Seattle Times and Juneau Empire in Alaska where the couple met.

The Woodwards reported on the Japanese internment as it transpired, and were among the few who publicly opposed it, as well as the only English-language newspaper on the West Coast to openly criticize it. Woodward and his wife warned about "the danger of a blind, wild hysterical hatred of all persons who can trace ancestry to Japan" the day after the Attack on Pearl Harbor. Bainbridge islanders of Japanese ancestry were the first in the United States to be relocated to internment camps. On Bainbridge Island alone, 227 Japanese civilians were incarcerated without charge. The Woodwards continued advocating for members of the community, and hired several as correspondents. These correspondents reported on camp events for publication in the Review. The paper lost advertisers and subscribers as a result of its advocacy, and 300 people attended a meeting intended to run the couple off the island.

In 1959, Walt Woodward attempted to buy Kitsap County Herald of Poulsbo after its owner Leo F. Perrault put the paper up for sale. Perrault, in a front-page editorial, wrote he declined Woodward's offer because he planned to close the Poulsbo plant and move printing of the Herald to his plant in Winslow. This would have resulted in job loss and a $16,000 annual payroll to vanish. In response, Woodward announced plans to launch a rival paper for the North Kitsap mainlands called The North Kitsap News. It was to be edited by Terry Schick, an employee at The Herald. Perrault fired Schick after learning the news. Later that year Perrault sold his paper to David Averil, who went on to buy Woodward's two papers in November 1962. The News was then absorbed into the Herald and Woodward was kept on as the Review's editor. At the time, the circulation was 1,200 for the News, 2,400 for the Herald and 2,200 for the Review. News editor Schick, an award-winning photographer, then joined the staff of the Bremerton Sun.

In 1976, Frances Niemeyer died. In 1978, Walt Woodward published a book on his adventures power-boating called "Walt Woodward's Big Toot," with Big Toot being the name of his recreational trawler. In 1986, the Woodwards received the first Edison Uno Memorial Civil Rights Award from Japanese American Citizens League for their editorials during WWII on how interning Japanese-Americans and seizing their property violated their Bill of Rights. Averill and his wife Vera successfully operated the Review and Herald while raising their four children. In 1988, the couple sold both papers to Black Press. The papers were then managed by Sound Publishing Inc. a subsidiary of Black Press. Mildred Woodward, who taught at Bainbridge High School from 1935 to 1976, died in 1989, at the age of 80. in 1994, Woodward Middle School was opened, which was named after the couple in their honor. Also in 1994, Walt Woodward served as inspiration for the character Arthur Chambers for the book "Snow Falling on Cedars" released that year, which was later turned into a film in 1999. He died in 2001, at the age of 91. Shortly after his death, the Asian American Journalists Association posthumously awarded him and his wife with a Special Recognition Award for their work during World War 2. In 2024, Black Press, owner of the Review, was acquired by Carpenter Media Group.
