= Vashon-Maury Island Beachcomber =

Newspaper based in Vashon, Washington, U.S.

- Type: Weekly newspaper
- Format: Broadsheet
- Owner: Sound Publishing
- Founder(s): Carl Nelson; John VanDevanter
- Publisher: Daralyn Anderson
- Editor: Aspen Anderson
- Founded: 1957
- Language: English
- Circulation: 2,531 (as of 2023)
- OCLC number: 17239155
- Website: vashonbeachcomber.com

The Vashon-Maury Island Beachcomber is a weekly newspaper based in Vashon in the U.S. state of Washington. It covers local news, sports, business, and community events for Vashon Island and Maury Island. The Island Beachcomber publishes once a week on Wednesdays. The newspaper is part of Sound Publishing, a group of local newspapers owned by the Black Press Group.

== History ==
The Vashon-Maury Island Beachcomber was founded on March 7, 1957, by Carl Nelson and John VanDevanter. It competed with an existing newspaper, the Vashon Island News-Record, which was founded in 1919 from the merger of two local newspapers. The News-Record was purchased by the Beachcomber in 1958 and was merged into the publication. Nelson and VanDevanter sold the newspaper in 1975 to Jay and Joan Becker, who also became the co-editors.

The Beachcomber was acquired by regional chain Sound Publishing in 1995 and converted into a tabloid-sized newspaper. The newspaper was also switched from mail delivery to home delivery for its 4,500 paid subscribers on Vashon and Maury islands. Jay Becker was retained as editor. In May 2020, Beachcomber editor Kevin Opsahl was laid off after being furloughed in March 2020. The Beachcomber was reduced to two editorial staff members, reporter Paul Rowley and arts editor Elizabeth Shepherd. In 2026, former owner Jay Becker died.
