= The Honolulu Advertiser =

Daily newspaper in Honolulu, Hawaii

- Hawaiʻi’s Paper
- Type: Daily newspaper
- Format: Broadsheet
- Owner: Black Press
- Founded: 1856 (as the Pacific Commercial Advertiser)
- Ceased publication: June 6, 2010 (Merged into Honolulu Star-Advertiser)
- Headquarters: 605 Kapiʻolani Blvd. Honolulu, Hawaii 96813; United States
- Circulation: 141,934 Morning; 155,932 Sunday (as of 2007)
- ISSN: 1072-7191
- OCLC number: 8807414
- Website: honoluluadvertiser.com

The Honolulu Advertiser was a daily newspaper published in Honolulu, Hawaii. At the time publication ceased on June 6, 2010, it was the largest daily newspaper in Hawaii. It published daily with special Sunday and Internet editions.

The Honolulu Advertiser was the parent publisher of Island Weekly, Navy News, Army Weekly, Ka Nupepa People, West Oahu People, Leeward People, East Oahu People, Windward People, Metro Honolulu People, and Honolulu People small, community-based newspapers for the public.

The Honolulu Advertiser has had a succession of owners since it began publishing in 1856 under the name the Pacific Commercial Advertiser. On February 25, 2010, Black Press, which owned the Honolulu Star-Bulletin, purchased The Honolulu Advertiser from Gannett Pacific Corporation, which acquired the Advertiser in 1992 after it had sold the Star-Bulletin to another publisher that later sold it to Black Press in 2000. On May 3, 2010, a new company set up by Black Press, HA Management, took over operations of the Advertiser and merged it with the Star-Bulletin on June 7, 2010, to form the Honolulu Star-Advertiser.

== History ==
=== Henry M. Whitney ===
Businessman and son of Congregational missionaries, Henry M. Whitney founded the Pacific Commercial Advertiser in 1856, a weekly newspaper that was circulated primarily in the whaling port of Honolulu. The inaugural edition was published on July 2 of that year with this statement from Whitney:

Thank Heaven, the day at length has dawned when the Hawaiian nation can boast a free press, untrammeled by government patronage or party pledges, unbiased by ministerial frowns or favors.

The new publication had four pages with five columns, and a clear division into thematic sections. The last page was in Hawaiian and titled Ka Hoku Loa Hawaii (The Morning Star of Hawaii). The first issue of PCA, as the weekly was quickly nicknamed, had a print run of 600 copies and was produced on a hand press.

The biggest story in the first edition was a report on the wedding of Kamehameha IV and Queen Emma. However, the front page was devoted almost exclusively to advertisements. Throughout the paper, Whitney posted fifty-two advertisements for sailing ships in port at Honolulu Harbor with three hundred vessel timetables. In 1870, Whitney went broke and was forced to sell the Commercial Advertiser to James Black and William Auld, local printers. Whitney stayed on as the newspaper's editor.

=== Claus Spreckels ===
In 1880, Black and Auld sold the Pacific Commercial Advertiser to cabinet minister Walter M. Gibson, who was generally under financial control of Claus Spreckels. John Edward Bush, who was minister of the interior at the time, arranged for a government loan, and a guarantee of all government printing contracts. Vehemently opposed to Spreckels's conservative and pro-monarchy political stance, Whitney, as a devout annexationist, resigned as editor. In his place, Wallace Rider Farrington, future Governor of the Territory of Hawaii, arrived from Maine to become the new editor. Spreckels's royalist slant in his editorial articles were deplored by many of the American businessmen residing in Hawaiʻi at the time. Revenue suffered as a result, forcing Spreckels to eventually sell the Pacific Commercial Advertiser.

=== Lorrin A. Thurston and Son ===
In 1888, Spreckels sold his newspaper to the Hawaiian Gazette Company. It in turn sold the newspaper in 1898 to Lorrin A. Thurston. Thurston was organizer of the Hawaiian League, which had forced King Kalākaua to agree to the "Bayonet Constitution" of 1887 backed by the Honolulu Rifles armed militia, and make Thurston a cabinet minister. The 1887 constitution stripped the monarchy of most authority, took away many rights of native Hawaiians to vote in elections, and granted voting rights to American residents, even those who did not have citizenship in the kingdom. Thurston had been instrumental to the overthrow of the monarchy and the end of the existence of the Kingdom of Hawaiʻi.

In 1921, Thurston changed the name of the Pacific Commercial Advertiser to The Honolulu Advertiser. The following year, Thurston hired Raymond S. Coll to be the newspaper editor. Coll served in that capacity until his retirement in 1959.

In 1931, Lorrin P. Thurston took over his father's position as editor and president of The Honolulu Advertiser. He would later become chairman of the Hawaii Statehood Commission. Upon Raymond Coll's retirement, Thurston hired George Chaplin, former editor of the military newspaper Pacific Stars and Stripes, as the editor of The Honolulu Advertiser. He would serve in this capacity for 28 years.

=== Thurston Twigg-Smith and George Chaplin ===
In 1961, Thurston Twigg-Smith continued family ownership as he inherited The Honolulu Advertiser from his uncle. He remained publisher and president until 1986. With the coupling of Chaplin and Twigg-Smith, The Honolulu Advertiser shifted its political slant from a staunchly conservative pro-Big Five newspaper to become a more moderate, racially progressive newspaper. Both were enormously influenced by the rising local Chinese American, Filipino American and Japanese American readership and worked to cater to these communities' news interests. In 1967, Twigg-Smith formed the Persis Corporation (known as Asa Hawaii Corporation until 1978) as the Advertiser's parent company.

=== Gannett Pacific Corporation ===
In 1992, The Honolulu Advertiser was purchased by the Gannett Pacific Corporation, a subsidiary of Gannett Company Incorporated. It became the first morning edition publication in Gannett's corporate history. The company had already owned Honolulu's other major newspaper, the Honolulu Star-Bulletin, since 1973. From 1962 to 2001, both dueling newspapers were administered under a joint operating agreement under which they shared printing and advertising operations but kept separate editorial staff and printing functions. The agreement ended when the Honolulu Star-Bulletin was sold to a separate company.

=== Acquisition by Black Press and merger ===
On February 25, 2010, Black Press, which owned the Honolulu Star-Bulletin, purchased The Honolulu Advertiser. As part of the deal to acquire the Advertiser, Black Press agreed to place the Star-Bulletin on the selling block. If no buyer came forward by March 29, 2010, Black Press started making preparations to operate both papers through a transitional management team and then combine the two dailies into one.

On March 30, 2010, three parties came forward with offers to buy the Star-Bulletin, but a month later on April 27, 2010, the bids were rejected because their bids for the Star-Bulletin was below the minimum liquidation price. Black Press canceled the sale as a result and proceeded with transition plans, which came on the same day that they were approved to take over the Advertiser by the Department of Justice.

On May 3, 2010, a new company set up by Black Press, HA Management, took over the operations of the paper while Black Press continued overseeing the Star-Bulletin during a 30- to 60-day transition period, in which both papers merged into one daily, The Honolulu Star-Advertiser. The Advertiser published its final edition at 12:01 AM on June 6, 2010, and Black Press officially launched the Honolulu Star-Advertiser as a broadsheet morning daily on June 7, 2010.

The newspaper will be based out of the former Star-Bulletin offices at Restaurant Row and published at the former Advertiser printing facilities in Kapolei. A total of 474 staffers are employed at the daily, 265 from the Advertiser and 209 from Star-Bulletin. The fonts still use the "Star-Bulletin" masthead but with "Advertiser" replacing the "Bulletin" name.

== Advertiser Building ==
The Honolulu Advertiser staff occupied the Advertiser Building on 605 Kapiʻolani Boulevard in downtown Honolulu up until its last day of business on June 4, 2010, and the final pressing of its June 6, 2010, issue. It was built in 1929 by the architectural firm Emory & Webb in the beaux arts style. From the 1930s through the 1950s the building's roof sported two radio towers with the transmitting antenna of AM radio station KGU strung between them.

Although Gannett sold the Advertiser in May 2010, the building that housed the newspaper was not immediately offered for sale as it was expected to be sold to a different party in the future. Employees and staff moved over to the "Star-Advertiser" offices at Restaurant Row and to the Kapolei facility, leaving the building vacant except for a small crew to remove most of the equipment and items in preparation for its sale.

The Advertiser Building has been used as a soundstage and housed small studios for Hawaii Five-0.
