= Grand Forks Gazette =

Canadian newspaper in British Columbia

- Type: Weekly newspaper
- Format: Broadsheet
- Owner(s): Black Press
- Publisher: Eric Lawson
- Editor: Della Mallette
- Founded: 1897
- Language: English
- Headquarters: Grand Forks, British Columbia, Canada
- Circulation: 1,823 (as of October 2022)
- Website: grandforksgazette.ca

The Grand Forks Gazette is a weekly newspaper in Grand Forks, British Columbia. It publishes Wednesday and is owned by Black Press.

== See also ==
- List of newspapers in Canada
