= King County Journal =

- Type: Daily newspaper
- Owner: Black Press
- Founded: 2002
- Ceased publication: 2007
- Language: English
- Headquarters: Kent, Washington

The King County Journal was a newspaper published in Kent, Washington, United States. It was formed in 2002 as a combination of the old Valley Daily News of Kent and the Journal-American of Bellevue, which merged when they were bought by Peter Horvitz. The newspaper had an initial combined circulation of 60,000. The Journal-American (later the Eastside Journal) was formed in 1976 from Bellevue and Kirkland weeklies, while the Valley Daily News (later the South County Journal) was created from non-daily newspapers in Renton, Kent and Auburn.

== Overview ==
In 2003, the paper eliminated zoned editions for the Eastside and South King County in an effort to reduce losses. A restructuring in 2004 resulted in laying off 7% of its staff. Most of the cuts were from the editorial staff, and included editor Tom Wolfe, who had served on the job since 1995. Barbara Morgan, the executive editor, took over the newsroom.

Sound Publishing, a subsidiary of Black Press of Canada, bought the paper in 2006, and closed the paper on January 21, 2007. In the face of competition from the Seattle Times and Seattle Post-Intelligencer newspapers, the combined Journal papers had been losing money since 1994, while circulation had dropped to 39,100. At the time it folded, the King County Journal was the state's eighth largest paper.

Before its purchase by Black Press, the King County Journal also published nine community newspapers ranging from Bothell/Kenmore to Kent. Two were published weekly, while the other seven were published twice monthly. With the closure of the Journal, Black announced increased frequency in the papers: all would be published either weekly or twice weekly beginning in early 2007. As of 2006, David Black became the largest publisher of community newspapers in the state.
