= North Kitsap Herald =

Newspaper published in Poulsbo, Washington, US

- Type: Weekly newspaper
- Owner: Sound Publishing
- Founder: Peter Iverson
- Editor: Steven Powell
- Founded: 1901
- Language: English
- City: Poulsbo, Washington
- Circulation: 780 (as of 2023)
- OCLC number: 22427133
- Website: kitsapdailynews.com

North Kitsap Herald is a newspaper based in the city of Poulsbo in the U.S. state of Washington. It publishes in print every Friday. Its website merged with other Sound Publishing newspaper websites in Kitsap County in 2017 to form Kitsap Daily News. The North Kitsap Herald is owned by Sound Publishing Inc., a subsidiary of Black Press.

== History ==
Peter Iverson (1861-1946) published the first edition of the Kitsap County Herald in 1901. Iverson was a native of Odda, Hardanger, Norway and learned the printing trade while living in Iowa. He served 12 years as mayor of Poulsbo and eight years as a state senator. He published the newspaper for 36 years.

Iverson was succeeded at the Herald around 1937 by Nels C. Gergerson, who later lost interest in the paper and leased it to Leo F. Perrault and is wife Edna. After eight months the couple purchased the Herald some time around 1945. Perrault expanded the paper's building to house new printing equipment in 1953, hired to expand staff to five full-time employees in 1954, and was elected president of the Washington Newspaper Publishers Association in 1955.

A few years later Perrault had put the paper up for sale and received two offers. One of them was from Walt Woodward, publisher of the Bainbridge Island Review. Perrault, in a front page editorial, wrote he declined Woodward's offer because he planned to close the Poulsbo plant and move printing of the Herald to his plant in Winslow. This would have resulted in job loss and a $16,000 annual payroll to vanish. Perrault made plans to sell his paper to the editor of a daily paper in Oregon. However, Woodward announced his plans to launch a rival paper for the North Kitsap mainlands called The North Kitsap News and it was to be edited by Terry Schick, an employee at The Herald. Perrault fired Schick after learning the news.

Perrault told the Bremerton Sun he was worried Woodward's announcement might scare off his buyer and put off his planned retirement. But the sale went through and David Averil, who worked as managing editor of the Albany Democrat-Herald for the past two years, became the Herald's new owner on Oct. 1, 1959. Woodward sold Averil his two papers in November 1962. The News was then absorbed into the Herald. Woodward was kept on as the Review's editor. At the time, the circulation was 1,200 for the News, 2,400 for the Herald and 2,200 for the Review. News editor Schick, an award-winning photographer, then joined the staff of the Sun. Averill and his wife Vera successfully operated the Review and Herald while raising their four children. In 1988, the couple sold both papers to Black Press. The papers were then managed by Sound Publishing Inc. a subsidiary of Black Press. The paper's name was changed to the North Kitsap Herald in 1995.

In March 2020, during the onset of the COVID-19 pandemic, the North Kitsap Herald issued a statement that it would halt Friday print editions of the publication for an unknown amount of time, and directed audiences to read the digital newspaper Kitsap Daily News, which is owned by Kitsap News Group, a division of Sound Publishing. In 2024, Black Press was acquired by Carpenter Media Group.

== Awards ==
The Herald was named a 2012 Newspaper of the Year by the Local Media Association and its editor was named Feature Writer of the Year in 2016 by the Washington Newspaper Publishers Association. The Herald periodically won awards for general excellence and community service in industry contests.
