= Black Press =

Canadian publisher of newspapers

Black Press Group Ltd.
- Type: Private
- Industry: Newspapers
- Founded: 1975; 51 years ago
- Headquarters: 15288 54A Avenue, Surrey, British Columbia, Canada
- Area served: Canada: Alberta, British Columbia, Northwest Territories, and Yukon; United States: Alaska, Hawaii, and Washington
- Key people: David Holmes Black (Chair)
- Owners: David Holmes Black; (100%, 1975–2002); David Holmes Black; (80.65%, 2002–24); Torstar; (19.35%, 2002–24); Carpenter Media Group; (2024–present)
- Subsidiaries: Northern News Services Ltd. Oahu Publications Inc. Sound Publishing Inc
- Website: www.blackpressmedia.com

Black Press Group Ltd. (BPG) is a Canadian commercial printer and newspaper publisher founded in 1975 by David Holmes Black. Based in Surrey, British Columbia, it was previously owned by the publisher of Toronto Star (Torstar, 19.35%) and Black (80.65%).

In March 2024, it was announced that Carpenter Media Group had completed its acquisition of the firm, in a deal that involved Canso Investment Counsel, Ltd.

== Overview ==
Also known as Black Press Media, the company publishes in the United States through two subsidiaries, Oahu Publications in Hawaii and Sound Publishing in Alaska and Washington. It also owns Northern News Services based in Yellowknife, Northwest Territories.

After acquiring three newspapers on the Kitsap Peninsula, it formed Sound Publishing in 1987 and has since operated all of its titles in Washington and Alaska. In turn, after purchasing Honolulu Star-Bulletin, the publisher passed the responsibility for maintaining its titles in Hawaii to Oahu Publications, a subsidiary formed in 2001 by BPG.

As of 2022, News Media Canada reported Black Press publishes 106 editions across Canada with a combined circulation of 1,295,243. The number of titles include 70 in British Columbia, 11 in Alberta, two in Northwest Territories and one in Yukon.

== History ==
=== Canadian business deals (1969–present) ===
In 1969, Alan Black and Clive Stangoe acquired the Williams Lake Tribune of Williams Lake, BC. The weekly newspaper had previously been owned by Northwest Publications, where Alan Black worked as a manager. After the company dissolved, he acquired a majority stake in the company's smallest title alongside Stangoe, who worked as the paper's publisher. The two owned the paper under the name Cariboo Press Ltd.

In 1975, Alan Black and Stangoe sold the Williams Lake Tribune to Alan Black's son David Black for $60,000. Black operated the Tribune exclusively for four years until purchasing the husband-and-wife owned Ashcroft-Cache Creek Journal in nearby Ashcroft in 1979. Black continued to purchase other newspapers over time and soon formed newspaper clusters around Victoria and Vancouver.

There was never a big plan to get big. It's just that another opportunity would come over the hill. Usually an independent would phone, wanting to retire or sell out, asking if we were interested in buying them.

— David Black

In June 1980, Black acquired the Lakes District News Houston Today. At some point prior he had also acquired the Smithers Interior News.

In 1984, Black purchased a majority stake in three newspapers and two web printing plants on Vancouver Island. The sale included Goldstream Gazette, Ladysmith-Chemainus Chronicle and Parksville-Qualicum News-Advertiser. The papers were merged into a new company which would also manage Sidney Review, which had been acquired earlier. The sale brought the total number of newspapers owned by Black up to 12.

In 1987, Black acquired the Salmon Arm Observer group on newspapers, which included the Chase-Shuswap Weekly, Eagle Valley News and Salmon Arm Observer.

In 1992, Black acquired the 100 Mile House Free Press.

In 1997, Black acquired 33 publications in western Canada from Trinity International Holdings PLC of Britain for $58 million. The sale included the Red Deer Advocate. By this time Black Press Ltd. had been established as Cariboo Press's parent company.

On September 19, 2002, Torstar Corporation announced that it was investing $20 million to acquire a 19.35% share in Black Press. At that time Black Press published 88 newspapers and had 11 printing plants. Annual revenues at the time were $240 million.

In 2006, Black Press acquired UsedEverywhere.com, a Canadian online classified website. The website re-branded to Used.ca in 2015.

On June 27, 2007, Black Press announced a $405 million takeover offer for Osprey Media, putting it in competition with Quebecor Media for Osprey's assets. Quebecor put in a higher bid and won ownership of Osprey. As of 2008 it owned about 150 newspapers.

In July 2010, Black Press acquired the Red Deer Express from Great West Newspapers, LP. The company acquired two other Central Alberta publications, the Sylvan Lake News and Eckville Echo, in June 2011. The two weekly newspapers were owned by Barry and Darlene Hibbert.

In July 2011, Black Press purchased of the Cranbrook Daily Townsman and the Kimberley Daily Bulletin by Don Kendall. At the time the two dallies published Monday to Friday, had a combined circulation of 5,000.

In 2013, Black Press and Glacier Media Inc. exchanged four community newspapers in British Columbia. That led to the closure of Abbotsford Times. In 2014, Black Press negotiated deals with Glacier Media Inc. to take effect in March 2015 that would exchange a dozen British Columbia newspapers that consolidated ownership of competing community papers on Vancouver Island and the Lower Mainland. Black Press obtained Harbor City Star, Nanaimo Daily News, Cowichan Citizen, Parksville Oceanside Star, Tofino/Ucluelet Westerly News, Comox Valley Echo, Campbell River Courier, Surrey Now and Langley Advance.

In August 2014, Black Press acquired Yukon News from owner Stephen Robertson.

In March 2021, Black Press purchased Northern News Services Limited of Yellowknife, Northwest Territories, which publishes five newspapers in the Northwest Territories and two in Nunavut.

In April 2023, Black Press entered a partnership with Village Media to license its custom content management system called Villager. The migration of Black Press sites will be completed in 2024.

On January 15, 2024, Black Press entered CCAA bankruptcy protection and announced a sales agreement. Founder David Black resigned as president shortly after the announcements. On January 16, Black Press filed for Chapter 15 bankruptcy in the United States. At the time of the bankruptcy, Black Press has 144 publications, including 35 in Washington under its Sound Publishing subsidiary.

=== Washington business deals (1987–present) ===
In 1987, David Black sold a 21% equity stake in his company to Shaw Communications to fund the purchase of about 15 newspapers. He bought stake back in 1990.

Black Press purchased the Whidbey Press Newspaper Group in 1987 from newspaperman Wallie Valentine Funk. The sale included the Whidbey News-Times, South Whidbey Record and Naval Air Station Whidbey Crosswind. In 1988, Black Press purchased the Port Orchard Independent, followed soon by the acquisition of the Bainbridge Island Review. In 1994, the subsidy was renamed to Sound Publishing. A year later the company acquired the Vashon Island Beachcomber. The Tacoma Daily Index was acquired next in 1997. A year later the company purchases Friday Harbor Journal and launches the Federal Way Mirror in response to Seattle Times Co. closing the Federal Way News.

In 2006, Black Press purchased nine newspapers from the family-owned Horvitz Newspapers Inc. The sale included the 41,000-circulation daily King County Journal; two weeklies, the Mercer Island Reporter and Snoqualmie Valley Record; and seven bi-weeklies, the Auburn Reporter, Bellevue Reporter, Bothell/Kenmore Reporter, Covington/Maple Valley Reporter, Kent Reporter, Redmond Reporter and Renton Reporter.

The King County Journal printed its last issue on Jan. 21, 2007. Forty full-time employees were laid off. Ten staffers were moved to weekly sister publications, and one was moved to marketing staff.

In June 2008, Black Press purchased The Enumclaw Courier-Herald, along with a 4-year-old sibling publication that serves the Bonney Lake/Lake Tapps area. The paper's were previously owned by the estate of Ted Natt along with John Natt, David Natt and current publisher Bill Marcum.

By July 2008, Black Press owned 15 community newspapers around the Seattle area, including 12 under the Reporter Newspapers brand, including the newly created Issaquah/Sammamish Reporter and the Sumner/Lake Tapps Reporter. Overall, the mostly free weeklies in King County reached about 300,000 households at the time.

In October 2008, Black Press purchased the Marysville Globe, Arlington Times, the regional Express Shopper and monthly business publications the Wenatchee Business Journal and the Bellingham Business Journal from Sun News Inc. The 3,400-circulation Wenatchee Business Journal was traded in August 2011 to CW Media, Inc. in exchange for the Okanogan Valley Gazette-Tribune. The Globe, The Times, and Bellingham Business Journal were are closed in April 2020 due to the COVID-19 recession in the United States.

In November 2011, Olympic View Publishing Company was purchased by Black Press from Brown M. Maloney. The sale included Sequim Gazette and Forks Forum. That same month Black Press acquired Peninsula Daily News and Sequim This Week from Horvitz Newspapers.

In January 2013, Voice Media Group sold Seattle Weekly to Black Press. The alt-weekly ceased its print edition and became an online-only publication in February 2019.

In February 2013, Black purchased The Everett Herald, a daily newspaper near Seattle. It had previously been owned for 35 years by the Washington Post Company.

In October 2014, Black Press purchased six newspapers from Stephens Media, including The Daily World in Aberdeen, the Montesano Vidette, the North Coast News in Ocean Shores and the South Beach Bulletin in Westport.

=== Hawaii business deals (2001–Present) ===
Black Press purchased the Honolulu Star-Bulletin in 2001. The newspaper had previously been owned by Liberty Newspapers LP, of Florida. The company planned to close the Star-Bulletin two years prior, but a federal antitrust lawsuit was filed and a judge ordered the paper be sold instead. Black Press emerged as the new owner for $10,000. Also in 2001, Black Press acquired RFD Publications, which owned the 280,000 circulation MidWeek.

The Honolulu Advertiser was acquired in 2010 and merged with the Star-Bulletin to create the Honolulu Star-Advertiser.

In October 2014, Black Press purchased six newspapers from Stephens Media. The sale included West Hawaii Today and Hawaii Tribune-Herald, as well as a 50% interest in Hawaii.com.

=== Akron Beacon Journal (2006–2018) ===
In 2006, Black Press acquired the Akron Beacon Journal, the former Knight Ridder flagship in Northeast Ohio, for $165 million.

Black Press sold the paper in April 2018 to GateHouse Media and acquired the Juneau Empire, Peninsula Clarion and Homer News in Alaska from GateHouse.

=== San Francisco Media Co. (2011–2020) ===
In 2011, David Black was one of several newspaper industry veterans who joined as investors in the San Francisco Newspaper Company to buy the former Hearst flagship The San Francisco Examiner from Clarity Media Group.

Media outlets initially reported the paper was purchased by Black's company Black Press, but Black only participated as a private investor and held shares in the Examiner separately from Black Press. The other owners included Todd Vogt and Pat Brown. Vogt was named president and CEO while Brown was named chief financial officer of the newly created San Francisco Media Co.

The company acquired the San Francisco Bay Guardian from Bruce Brugmann in April 2012 and SF Weekly from Voice Media Group in January 2013.

In May 2014, Vogt announced plans to sell his shares of the company to Black Press' Hawaiian-subsidy Oahu Publications Inc., or to buy Black out of the company by the end of the month.

"Unless I can find local partners, I'm not gonna do the deal," Vogt told staff. "I've got 25 days to do a deal or sell out."

Vogt did sell to Oahu, which subsequently became San Francisco Media Co.'s parent company. Dennis Francis, president of Oahu Publications, became the company's new president, and in August 2014, Glenn Zuehls was named publisher.

In October 2014, Zuehls announced Bay Guardian, saying "the obstacles for a profitable Bay Guardian are too great to overcome."

In 2020, San Francisco Media Co., including the Examiner and SF Weekly, was sold to Clint Reilly Communications.

== Newspapers in Canada ==
=== Alberta ===
- Bashaw Star
- Castor Advance
- Central Alberta Life
- Eckville Echo
- Lacombe Express
- Pipestone Flyer
- Ponoka News
- Red Deer Advocate
- Rimbey Review
- Stettler Independent
- Sylvan Lake News

==== Farm Press Publications ====
- Farmer Stockman Ad-visor (Alberta South)
- Farmer Stockman Ag-visor (Alberta North)
- Saskatchewan Farm Life
- Manitoba Farm Life

=== British Columbia ===
==== Interior – North ====
- 100 Mile House Free Press
- Bella Coola Coast Mountain News
- Burns Lake District News
- Fort Nelson News
- Fort St. James Caledonia Courier
- Haida Gwaii Observer
- Houston Today
- Kitimat Northern Sentinel
- Prince Rupert Northern View
- Quesnel Cariboo Observer
- Smithers Interior News
- Terrace Standard
- Vanderhoof Omenica Express
- Stuart/Nechako Advertiser
- Williams Lake Tribune

==== Interior – South ====
- Ashcroft-Cache Creek Journal
- Barriere N. Thompson Star Journal
- Castlegar News
- Clearwater N. Thompson Times
- Columbia Valley Pioneer
- Cranbrook Townsman
- Creston Valley Advance
- Fernie Free Press
- Golden Star
- Grand Forks Gazette
- Kelowna Capital News
- Keremeos Review
- Kimberley Bulletin
- Kootenay News Advertiser
- Lakeshore Shuswap Market News
- Nakusp Arrow Lakes News
- Nelson Star
- Peachland View
- Penticton Western News
- Princeton Similkameen Spotlight
- Revelstoke Times Review
- Rocky Mountain Goat (Valemount)
- Rossland News
- Salmon Arm Observer
- Sicamous Eagle Valley News
- Summerland Review
- Times Chronicle (Oliver & Osoyoos)
- Trail Daily Times
- Vernon Morning Star
- West Kelowna News
- West Kootenay Advertiser
- Winfield Lake Country Calendar

==== Lower Mainland ====
- Abbotsford News
- Agassiz-Harrison Observer
- Aldergrove Star
- Chilliwack Progress
- Cloverdale Reporter
- Hope Standard
- Langley Advance Times
- Maple Ridge-Pitt Meadows News
- Mission City Record
- North Delta Reporter
- Peace Arch News
- Punjab Link
- Surrey Now News-Leader

==== Vancouver Island ====
- Alberni Valley News
- Campbell River Mirror
- Chemainus Valley Courier
- Comox Valley Record
- Cowichan Valley Citizen
- Goldstream News Gazette
- Gulf Islands Driftwood
- Ladysmith Chronicle
- Lake Cowichan Gazette
- Monday Magazine
- Nanaimo News Bulletin
- North Island Gazette
- Oak Bay News
- Parksville Qualicum News
- Peninsula News Review
- Saanich News
- Sooke News Mirror
- Tofino/Ucluelet Westerly News
- Victoria News

=== Territories ===
==== Nunavut ====
- Kivalliq News
- Nunavut News/North

==== Northwest Territories ====
- Hay River Hub
- Northwest Territories News/North
- Yellowknifer

==== Yukon ====
- Yukon News

== Newspapers in United States ==
=== Hawaii ===
Oahu Publications Inc., a subsidiary of Black Press, publishes the largest daily newspaper in Hawaii, the Honolulu Star-Advertiser, along with several community newspapers, magazines and other titles including the entertainment weekly Midweek.

- The Garden Island
- Hawaii Tribune-Herald
- Honolulu Star-Advertiser
- Midweek
- West Hawaii Today

=== Washington and Alaska ===
Sound Publishing Inc., a subsidiary of Black Press, is based in Everett, Washington, and is the largest community news publisher by circulation in the state of Washington. The company's holdings include four daily newspapers, The Herald, the Peninsula Daily News, The Daily World and the Tacoma Daily Index government listings publication. Sound Publishing acquired three newspapers in Alaska in 2018. Community newspapers owned by Sound Publishing are:

King County

- Auburn Reporter
- Bellevue Reporter
- Bothell/Kenmore Reporter
- Covington Reporter
- Enumclaw Courier-Herald
- Federal Way Mirror
- Issaquah Reporter
- Kent Reporter
- Kirkland Reporter
- Mercer Island Reporter
- Redmond Reporter
- Renton Reporter
- Seattle Weekly
- Snoqualmie Valley Record
- Tacoma Daily Index
- Vashon-Maury Island Beachcomber

Grays Harbor County

- The (Aberdeen) Daily World
- Aberdeen Real Estate

Island County

- South Whidbey Record
- Whidbey Crosswind
- Whidbey News-Times

Jefferson & Clallam Counties

- Forks Forum
- Peninsula Daily News
- Sequim Gazette

Kitsap County

- 98110 (Bainbridge)
- Bainbridge Island Review
- Central Kitsap Reporter
- Kingston Community News
- Kitsap Daily News
- North Kitsap Herald
- Port Orchard Independent

Okanogan County

- Okanogan Valley Gazette-Tribune

San Juan County

- Islands Real Estate
- Islands' Sounder
- Islands' Weekly
- Journal of the San Juan Islands

Snohomish County

- The (Everett) Daily Herald
- Herald Business Journal
- La Raza

Alaska

- Homer News
- Juneau Empire
- Peninsula Clarion

== Defunct newspapers ==
- Honolulu Advertiser: purchased February 2010, merged four months later into Star-Advertiser
- Honolulu Star-Bulletin: purchased 2001, merged with Advertiser in 2010
- King County Journal of Kent, Washington: purchased November 2006, closed two months later
- Nelson Daily News of Nelson, British Columbia: purchased July 2010, closed two weeks later
- Prince Rupert Daily News of Prince Rupert, British Columbia: purchased July 2010, closed two weeks later
- Pacific County Press: sold and then merged into the Willapa Harbor Herald on July 1, 2019
- South Beach Bulletin: suspended on Aug. 29, 2019
- The Arlington Times: ceased operation in April 2020
- Marysville Globe: ceased operation in April 2020
- The Bellingham Business Journal: ceased operation in April 2020
- The North Coast News in Ocean Shores: ceased operation in April 2020
- The Vidette in Montesano: ceased operation in April 2020
- Greenwood Boundary Creek Times: ceased operation in March 2022
- Inuvik Drum: ceased operation in January 2025
- The Okanogan Valley Gazette-Tribune: ceased operation in March 2026

== Controversies ==
=== Nisga'a Treaty editorials ===
In 1998, company owner David Black instructed his British Columbia papers to publish a series of editorials opposing the Nisga'a Treaty, which was the first modern treaty in B.C. history, and not to publish editorials in favour of the treaty.

In January 1999, the NDP government filed a complaint to the B.C. Press Council against Black Press, arguing that its policy breached its duty to act in the public interest and violated the council's constitution. Black Press said that news coverage was not affected and editors were free to publish their opinions on their letters page.

The Press Council sided with Black Press based on finding that its newspapers "did in fact carry a diversity of opinion on the Nisga'a Treaty, including those of Premier Glen Clark, Liberal Leader Gordon Campbell, Reform Party President Bill Vander Zalm as well as those of ordinary British Columbians".

=== Advertiser concerns ===
In August 2007, a story in the Victoria News sparked a complaint from an advertiser and led to the firing/resignation of three senior Black Press employees. Victoria News reporter Brennan Clarke quit the publication after a story he wrote about buying cheaper cars in the United States led to a complaint from Victoria car dealership Dave Wheaton Pontiac Buick GMC. Black Press claimed the article was not balanced, and said that reporters and editors should not purposely jeopardize advertising revenue with their stories, because that revenue pays their salaries. The company also fired the Victoria News long-time editor, Keith Norbury, in part because of the complaint, and Black Press's Vancouver Island Newsgroup regional editor, Brian Lepine, resigned in protest.

The Canadian Association of Journalists publicly questioned the credibility and independence of the Victoria News, wondering how many stories Black Press kills behind the scenes because of advertising concerns.

== See also ==
- List of newspapers in Canada
- List of newspapers in Washington (state)
