= Alberni Valley News =

Newspaper in Port Alberni, BC, Canada

- Type: Weekly newspaper
- Format: Broadsheet
- Owner(s): Black Press
- Publisher: Rick Major
- Editor: Siobhan Burns
- Founded: 1967
- Language: English
- Headquarters: 4918 Napier Street; Port Alberni, British Columbia; V9Y 3H5
- Circulation: 9,174 (as of October 2022)
- ISSN: 0839-2706
- Website: albernivalleynews.com

The Alberni Valley News is a weekly newspaper in Port Alberni, on Vancouver Island in British Columbia. It publishes Wednesday and is owned by Black Press.

== History ==
The News was part of David Radler's Sterling Newspapers chain in the 1970s, and became part of the Southam chain when Radler and Conrad Black incorporated Southam into Hollinger Inc.; this chain was, at the time, the dominant newspaper publisher in British Columbia, and also included the Nanaimo Daily News, Times Colonist and several weeklies.

Along with the rest of Southam, ownership of the Vancouver Island newspapers passed to Canwest in 2000, then Postmedia Network in 2010.

Postmedia sold its Vancouver Island properties and Lower Mainland weeklies to Glacier Media in 2011 for $86.5 million. In 2015, Glacier Media sold all its island papers except for the Times Colonist to Black Press.

== See also ==
- List of newspapers in Canada
