= Honolulu Star-Advertiser =

Daily newspaper in Hawaii, US

- Type: Daily newspaper
- Format: Broadsheet
- Owner: Oahu Publications
- Publisher: Dennis Francis
- Founded: June 7, 2010 (merger between The Honolulu Advertiser and Honolulu Star-Bulletin)
- Headquarters: 7 Waterfront Plaza, Suite 500; 500 Ala Moana Blvd. Honolulu, Hawaii 96813; US
- Circulation: 69,900 Average print circulation 6,016 Digital Subscribers
- Website: staradvertiser.com

The Honolulu Star-Advertiser is the largest daily newspaper in Hawaii, formed in 2010 with the merger of The Honolulu Advertiser and the Honolulu Star-Bulletin after the acquisition of the former by Black Press, which already owned the latter. It is owned by Carpenter Media Group, which bought Black Press in 2024.

== History ==
On February 25, 2010, Canadian publisher Black Press, which owned the Honolulu Star-Bulletin, purchased The Honolulu Advertiser, then owned by Gannett Corporation, for $125 million. As part of the deal to acquire the Advertiser, Black Press agreed to place the Star-Bulletin on the selling block. If no buyer came forward by March 29, 2010, Black Press would start making preparations to operate both papers through a transitional management team and then combine the two dailies into one.

On March 30, 2010, three parties came forward with offers to buy the Star-Bulletin, but on April 27, the bids were rejected because their bids for the Star-Bulletin were below the minimum liquidation price. Black Press canceled the sale and proceeded with transition plans, which came on the same day that they were approved to take over the Advertiser by the United States Department of Justice. On May 3, a new company set up by Black Press, HA Management, took over the operations of the paper, while Black Press continued overseeing the Star-Bulletin during a 30- to 60-day transition period, after which both papers merged into one daily, The Honolulu Star-Advertiser.

Both the Advertiser and the Star-Bulletin published their final editions as separate publications on June 6 and Black Press officially launched the Honolulu Star-Advertiser as a broadsheet morning daily on June 7.

In May 2020, the newspaper moved to a six-day printing schedule, eliminating its Saturday edition. In June 2020, due to the COVID-19 recession in the United States, the paper laid off 15 of its 34 reporters, two photographers, three page designers, seven clerks, three graphic artists, and a web designer.

In July 2023, four editorial employees accepted a voluntary buyout offer and left the paper. In March 2024, Carpenter Media Group bought Black Press, which owned the paper's publisher, Oahu Publications. In October 2024, thirteen employees, including six newsroom workers, were laid off.

== Format and operations ==
Before the merger, the Honolulu Advertiser published in broadsheet format while the Honolulu Star-Bulletin published in tabloid format. The Star-Advertiser uses the Advertiser's broadsheet format and a modified Star-Bulletin masthead (with the name "Advertiser" replacing "Bulletin" in the masthead's blackletter font).

The newsroom for the combined paper is in the former Star-Bulletin offices in Restaurant Row, with the paper printed and distributed from the Advertiser's facilities in Kapolei. About 453 jobs were eliminated in the consolidation, leaving a combined staff of 474.

The paper sells in retail outlets for $1.50 on Oahu daily and $3 Sundays plus Thanksgiving Day. The price on all other islands is $2 and $3.50, respectively.
