= 2014 Marysville Pilchuck High School shooting =

Mass shooting in Washington, U.S.

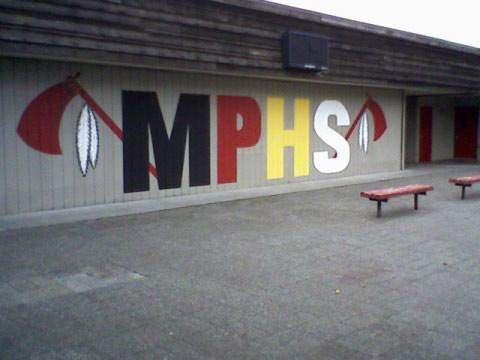
- Photo of art mural at Marysville Pilchuck High School in October 2009
- Location: 48°5′45.58″N 122°9′16.34″W; Marysville, Washington, U.S.
- Date: October 24, 2014; 12 years ago 10:39 – 10:42 a.m. (PDT; UTC−07:00)
- Target: Friends and relatives of Jaylen Fryberg at Marysville Pilchuck High School
- Attack type: Mass shooting; mass murder; murder–suicide; school shooting
- Weapon: .40 caliber Beretta Px4 Storm Subcompact semi-automatic pistol
- Deaths: 5 (including the perpetrator)
- Injuries: 3 (1 by gunfire)
- Perpetrator: Jaylen Ray Fryberg
- Defender: Megan Silberberger
- Motive: Unknown
- Charges: 6 counts of illegal firearms possession
- Convicted: Raymond Fryberg, Jr.
- Litigation: 2 (Note: Lawsuit by victims' families against the Marysville School District Lawsuit by Carmen Lopez against the Marysville School District)

On October 24, 2014, 15-year-old freshman student Jaylen Fryberg shot five students at Marysville Pilchuck High School in Marysville, Washington, killing four, before killing himself. Fryberg's father, Raymond Fryberg, was arrested and convicted the following year for illegally purchasing and owning the gun used in the shooting, among other firearm offenses, and sentenced to 2 years in prison.

The shooting is the deadliest school shooting in the history of Washington state.

== Events ==
Prior to the shooting, Fryberg invited several students, all of whom were friends including three cousins, to meet him for lunch via text message. He urged some of them to skip classes they had at the time. Minutes prior to the shooting, he reportedly sent a group text message to his family and the families of his would-be victims. In it, he apologized for his actions and laid out plans for his funeral.

At lunchtime, the invited students (Shaylee Chuckulnaskit, Zoe Galasso, Gia Soriano, Andrew Fryberg, Nate Hatch, Keryn Parks and Carmen Lopez) sat together at one table. Fryberg then entered the school cafeteria and sat down at a different table. At 10:39 a.m., according to eyewitnesses, he stood up, approached the table where his friends were sitting, and had a verbal altercation with them. He then pulled out a .40-caliber Beretta Px4 Storm Subcompact handgun and fired at least eight shots, shooting several of the students in a "calm, methodical way". During the shooting, Fryberg was described by a witness as having "a blank stare" and "staring at the victims as he shot them". He also appeared to be targeting only the table where his friends were sitting. At the time of the shooting, seven students were seated at that table. All victims were shot once in the head.

Fryberg died at the scene from a self-inflicted gunshot wound. An early eyewitness report stated that an adult school staff member tried to intervene by grabbing Fryberg's arm, inadvertently causing him to fatally shoot himself in the neck. The employee was later identified as first-year social studies teacher Megan Silberberger, who tried to apprehend Fryberg as he may have been attempting to reload.

Police officials and the Snohomish County medical examiner later clarified that Fryberg committed suicide by shooting himself in the head and that Silberberger did not touch him in the moments preceding his death, though she did make an attempt to subdue him. Shortly after Fryberg committed suicide, Silberberger contacted authorities. The motive for the shooting is unknown, although a student at the school stated that "[he] was angry at a girl who would not date him, and that the girl was one of the people shot", a claim that was supported by other classmates and by Fryberg's family members.

== Aftermath ==
Law enforcement radio communications on channel Marysville POL1 between 1039 and 1240 hours provided by SnoPAC911 with silence truncated by a third party. This is the channel that the school resource officer was communicating on at the time of the shooting.

Law enforcement radio communications provided by SnoPAC911 combined into one file between 1039 and 1240 hours

After the shooting, recordings of police radio communications during the event were released by the Snohomish County Police Staff and Auxiliary Services Center after requests for public records. A timeline was also provided by Marysville police spokesman Robb Lamoureux. According to the timeline and recordings, an anonymous 9-1-1 caller, using a cellphone, first alerted police to the shooting. The school resource officer was the first law enforcement officer to make contact with the victims, arriving at the scene a minute after the first 9-1-1 call was received. He immediately reported that a fire alarm was going off and that there were students and staff evacuating from the building. A dispatcher then informed him about a report of a possible shooting in the cafeteria. The officer responded, "Ocean 12, it's confirmed. We have a shooter. We have five down." He later said, "Shooter is DOA [dead on arrival]. We have got apparently four [victims.]" Soon afterward, he said, "Ocean 12, I need aid here. I have two that are still breathing and alive. Looks like I have three possibly deceased." The first paramedics arrived on the scene ten minutes after the first radio dispatch.

At the time of the shooting, approximately 150 people were inside the cafeteria. A vice-principal ordered the school to go into lockdown. The victims were all identified as friends of Fryberg. It was initially reported that at least six students were wounded.

Some students fled the cafeteria immediately after the shooting started. Several climbed over the fence of a house next to the school and sought shelter there. Other students disregarded the school lockdown rules and fled their classrooms while they were in place. As the school was cleared by local law enforcement officials, students were taken by bus to a nearby church. It took two hours for officers to evacuate hundreds of students who were still hiding inside the school, and more than 100 witnesses were interviewed by investigators.

Classes at Marysville Pilchuck High were canceled for the following week, as well as an upcoming football game. The cafeteria where the shooting took place was never reopened and has since been demolished and replaced with a grass lawn.

In the wake of the shooting, threats were made against several students belonging to the Tulalip tribe, the Native American tribe Fryberg belonged to. A spokesman for the Marysville School District stated that the school district was taking the threats seriously. The school reopened on November 3, with about fifteen counselors present on campus.

On October 30, a memorial service was held for Fryberg at a recreation center on the Tulalip Indian Reservation. Hundreds of people were in attendance.

On September 2, 2015, more than 2,200 pages of investigative documents were released to the public by Snohomish County authorities. They consisted of interviews with Fryberg's classmates, many of whom were feet away when Fryberg first opened fire.

=== Origin of the gun ===
On March 31, 2015, Raymond Lee Fryberg Jr., Jaylen Fryberg's father, was arrested for purchasing five guns, including the Beretta handgun used during the shooting, from a Cabela's store between January 2013 and July 2014. He reportedly lied on a background check that there were no restrictions imposed against him in the purchases. In 2002, his then-partner issued a permanent order of protection against him after he threatened and assaulted her. The order barred him from making legal firearm purchases. Fryberg had previously violated the order in September 2012. Immediately following his arrest, Fryberg appeared at a brief hearing in the Seattle District Court, where a preliminary hearing was set for April 14, 2015. He was later released under supervision by a federal magistrate judge on April 2, 2015.

On April 16, 2015, Raymond Fryberg reappeared in court and pleaded not guilty to six counts of illegal firearm possession concerning nine guns. A federal jury found him guilty of knowingly owning firearms that he legally was forbidden to possess. On January 11, 2016, he was sentenced to two years in prison.

=== Victims ===
Casualties
Killed Students: Zoë Galasso, 14 (died in cafeteria); Gia Soriano, 14 (died in hospital); Shaylee Chuckulnaskit, 14 (died in hospital); Andrew Fryberg, 15 (died in hospital)
Perpetrator: Jaylen Fryberg, 15 (self-inflicted wound)
Wounded: Nate Hatch, 14 (shot in cafeteria); Two unidentified victims (minor injuries)

Zoë Raine Galasso (born February 22, 2000) was killed at the scene by a single gunshot wound to her head. Her death was ruled a homicide.

Shaylee Adelle Chuckulnaskit (born March 26, 2000) and Gia Christine Soriano (born March 31, 2000) were taken to Providence Regional Medical Center Everett in critical condition, with single gunshot wounds to the head. The wounds were reportedly so severe that both were not immediately identifiable. It was announced on the evening of October 26 that Gia Soriano had died from her wounds. On October 31, one week after the shooting, Shaylee Chuckulnaskit was also confirmed to have died from her wounds.

Andrew Martin Leroy Fryberg (born August 10, 1999), a cousin of Jaylen Fryberg, was also taken to Providence Regional Medical Center, where he was in critical condition from two gunshot wounds, including one to the head. Late in the evening on November 7, two weeks after the shooting, it was confirmed that he had died from his wounds. He was the only victim shot twice.

Nate Hatch, another cousin of Jaylen Fryberg, suffered a single gunshot wound to the jaw and was taken to Harborview Medical Center in Seattle for treatment. He was listed in serious condition and placed in intensive care. His condition was upgraded to satisfactory on October 27, after having surgery to repair his jaw. He was discharged from the hospital on November 6.

Two other students were treated for minor injuries at the school, although it was unclear whether these injuries were inflicted by gunfire. Two female students who were sitting at the same table as the victims, including another cousin of Fryberg's, were not injured by gunfire.

=== Changes made to the school ===
==== Memorial walk ====
On October 24, 2024, the tenth anniversary of the shooting, a memorial walk in Marysville was hosted.

==== New cafeteria ====
In January 2016, a new cafeteria called the Food Commons was opened. This replaced the old cafeteria where the shooting took place. It was built to show that the school was moving forward, and to provide a place to eat that didn't remind the students of what had happened.

== Perpetrator ==
Jaylen Ray Fryberg (July 31, 1999 – October 24, 2014), a 15-year-old freshman student at the school, was identified as the shooter based on reports from other students at the scene. Fryberg was a wrestler and football player at the school. He was described as "generally happy", "a really nice kid", and "not a violent person". He was later said to have been experiencing difficulties in adjusting to the school environment, with his grades slipping and missing classes for several days.

Fryberg was of Native American descent and a member of the Tulalip tribe. He was close friends with his cousins Andrew Fryberg and Nate Hatch. One week prior to the shooting, Fryberg had been announced as the school's freshman homecoming prince at a football game. He used multiple social media accounts that frequently depicted him hunting and using rifles. The ownership of the Beretta handgun used in the shooting was traced to Fryberg's father.

Fryberg's last few Twitter posts were described as "emotional". Hours before the shooting, a fellow student had asked him if he was doing okay following a fight with another student who had been using racial slurs. Fryberg had been suspended from school and the football team following the fight.

A student claimed that Fryberg fought with a student over a girl, and another that one of Fryberg's victims was a girl who turned him down when he asked her out on a date. This girl, later identified as Zoë Raine Galasso, was reported to have been dating Fryberg's cousin Andrew at the time. Fryberg also had an ex-girlfriend at the time of the shooting, Shilene George, to whom he sent pictures of himself with the handgun in the school cafeteria immediately prior to the shooting. She told authorities she was forced to end the relationship days prior to the shooting after Fryberg became violent with her.

== Reactions ==
Washington State Senator John McCoy, a member of the Tulalip tribe, said in a released statement, "I do know the family. We're all related in one shape or form. We live and work and play together." Washington Governor Jay Inslee also said in a Twitter post regarding the shooting, "Like all of WA, [my wife] and I have everyone at #MPHS in our hearts and prayers. Please take care of each other." He later declared November 3 "Red and White Day" in the state, urging Washington residents to wear red and white, the school colors of Marysville Pilchuck High, as a sign of support. Secretary of Education Arne Duncan pledged his support for the Marysville community and commented regarding the national issue of gun violence, "Gun violence has no place anywhere, least of all at our nation's schools, and we must do more to keep guns out of the wrong hands."

The Tulalip tribe released a statement on October 29 denouncing Fryberg's "horrific actions" and adding that the shooting was "the [act] of an individual, not a family, not a tribe". They later added, "We are supporting the family of Jaylen Fryberg in their time of loss, but that does not mean we condone his actions."

The school football team was met by the Seattle Seahawks football team and were invited to their practice facility on October 28. On November 2, players on the Seahawks and the Oakland Raiders teams wore decals of Marysville Pilchuck High on their helmets during a game at CenturyLink Field in Seattle. Inactive Seahawks players, coaches, and staff also wore lapel pins bearing the same decals. In addition, a moment of silence was observed before the game began.

A vigil was attended by over 1,000 people on the evening of October 24, 2014, at the Grove Church. The football team from Oak Harbor High School showed up in uniform. They had been scheduled to play Marysville Pilchuck in a playoff game for the division title Friday night, but it was canceled. Becky Cooke Berg, superintendent of the Marysville School District, said Oak Harbor, Washington had offered to accept second place out of respect for its opponents. "We understand other teams in the league will be wearing red and white in support of Marysville-Pilchuck," Berg said. A second vigil occurred the next day at Mountain View Presbyterian Church. On October 27, a moment of silence was observed by the Marysville community at 10:39 a.m., exactly 72 hours from the moment the shooting started.

== See also ==
- List of school shootings in the United States
- List of school shootings in the United States by death toll
