= Priest (disambiguation) =

A priest is a person who holds an office in a religion, for example an Orthodox Christian priest, Catholic priest, Hindu priest, an Imam in Islam, or a Kohen in Judaism.

Priest may also refer to:

== Characters ==
- Reginald J. Priest, President of the United States in the TV series The Lexx
- Youngblood Priest, protagonist of the 1972 film Super Fly
- Grand Priest, a character from Dragon Ball Super

== Films ==
- Priest (1994 film), a British film
- Priest (2011 film), an American film loosely based on the Korean comic
- The Priest (2009 film), a Russian film
- The Priest (2021 film), a Malayalam-language Indian film
- The Priests (film), a 2015 South Korean film

== Music ==
- The Priests, an Irish vocal trio
  - The Priests (album), 2008
- "The Priest", a song by Limp Bizkit from the 2005 album The Unquestionable Truth (Part 1)
- "The Priest", a song by Joni Mitchell from the 1970 album Ladies of the Canyon
- Priests (band), a post-punk band from Washington, D.C., U.S.

== People ==
- Priest (surname)
- Priest (writer) (born 1988), Chinese novelist
- Priest Holmes (born 1973), American football running back
- Priest Lauderdale (born 1973), American basketball player

== Places ==
=== Canada ===
- Priest Mine, Ontario

=== United Kingdom ===
- Priest Cove, Cornwall
- Priest Island, Scotland

=== United States ===
- The Priest (mountain), Nelson County, Virginia
- Priest, California
- Priest Lake, Idaho
- Priest Point, Washington
- Priest Rapids on the Columbia River, Washington state
  - Priest Rapids Dam
- Priest River, Idaho

== Tools ==
- Priest (tool), a tool for killing fish
- PriEsT, a software tool to help making decisions

== Other uses ==
- M7 Priest, an informal name for an American World War II self-propelled artillery vehicle
- Priest (manhwa), a Korean Weird West comic
- Priest (TV series), a 2018 South Korean television series
- Priest hole, a hiding place for a priest built into many Catholic houses of England
- Priest (World of Warcraft), a class in World of Warcraft and other MMORPGs
- The Priest, a magazine for priests published by Our Sunday Visitor
- Priest (Latter Day Saints)

== See also ==
- Preist, a municipality in Germany
- Priest (comics)
- Priestess (disambiguation)
- High priest (disambiguation)
- Saint-Priest (disambiguation)
- Judas Priest, an English heavy metal band formed in 1969
