= Tulalip Heritage High School =

Coordinates: 48°03′43″N 122°11′56″W

Location
- 7204 27th Ave NE; Marysville, Washington 98271; United States

Information
- Type: Public, secondary school
- School district: Marysville School District
- Grades: 9-12
- Enrollment: 88 (2021-22)
- Colors: Red, black, & white
- Athletics conference: Northwest 1B
- Team name: Hawks
- Website: Heritage High School website

Tulalip Heritage High School (Lushootseed: dxʷlilap x̌alalʔtxʷ) is a public secondary school for grades 9-12 and is part of the Marysville School District. It is located on the Tulalip reservation. Heritage High School shares its campus with Legacy High School and Tenth Street Middle School.

Heritage High School was built in 2008, though the school traces its history back to Project Salmon at Marysville Pilchuck High School in the 1990s.

Since 2022, Heritage High School has replaced traditional tests and grading with the "Big Picture" model, a focus on experiential learning and a year-end project to demonstrate mastery of curriculum. Students spend three days a week in class and the other two days doing internships and independent study. Education at Heritage is also community based, in partnership with the Tulalip tribes. For example, a student interested in marine biology can work with the tribal fishery to gain experience. Heritage High School aims to "decolonize" education.
