= Priestess (disambiguation) =

A priestess is a female priest, a woman having the authority or power to administer religious rites.

Priestess may also refer to:

- Ordained female priest (female religious ordinate); see Ordination of women
- Priestess (religious honorific), a religious honorific
- Priestess (album), an album by Gil Evans
- Priestess (band), a Canadian hard rock band
- Priestess (rapper), an Italian rapper
- The Priestess, an Armenian film
- The High Priestess, a Major Arcana Tarot card

== See also ==
- Priest (disambiguation)
- High priestess (disambiguation)
