= Priest Point, Washington =

Priest Point, Washington č̓ƛ̕aʔqs (Lushootseed)
- former CDP
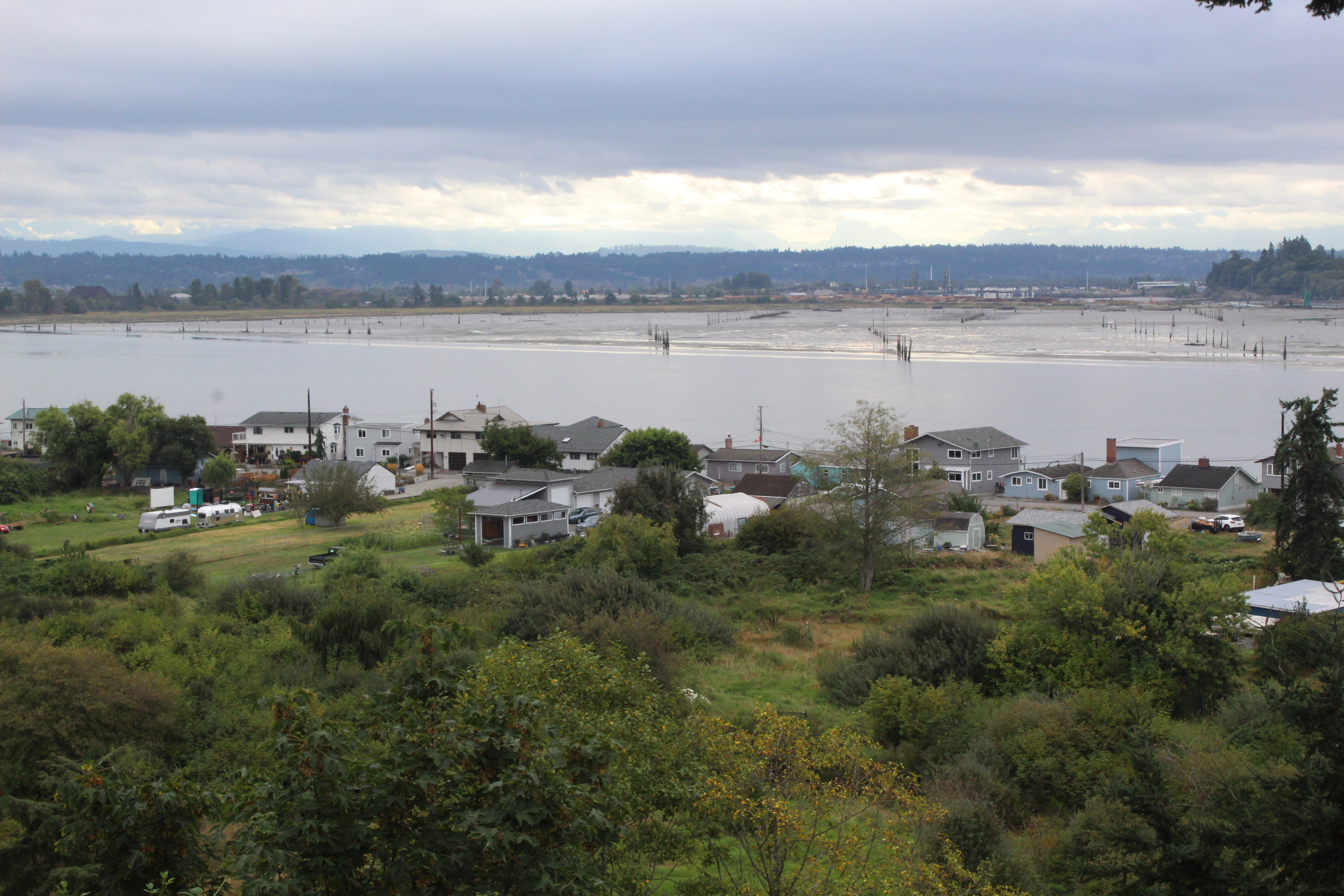
- View of Priest Point, Washington from Priest Point Cemetery.

- Location of Priest Point, Washington
- Coordinates: 48°2′14″N 122°13′53″W
- Country: United States
- State: Washington
- County: Snohomish

Area
  - Total: 3.0 sq mi (7.7 km^{2})
  - Land: 0.66 sq mi (1.7 km^{2})
  - Water: 2.3 sq mi (6.0 km^{2})
- Elevation: 95 ft (29 m)

Population (2000)
  - Total: 779
  - Density: 1,209/sq mi (466.8/km^{2})
- Time zone: UTC-8 (Pacific (PST))
  - Summer (DST): UTC-7 (PDT)
- FIPS code: 53-56304
- GNIS feature ID: 1867628

Priest Point (Lushootseed: č̓ƛ̕aʔqs) is a residential area within the Tulalip Indian Reservation in Snohomish County, Washington, United States. It was a census-designated place (CDP) during the 2000 census with a population of 779. The CDP was discontinued at the 2010 census.

Based on per capita income, one of the more reliable measures of affluence, Priest Point ranks 74th of 522 areas in the state of Washington to be ranked.

== History ==
The Snohomish people had a village at Rocky Point (Lushootseed: č̓ƛ̕aʔqs) that was primarily used for temporary dwellings outside of the rainy months; it was across the mouth of the Snohomish River from the more prominent village of hibulb at modern-day Preston Point in Everett. The site was partially excavated in 2001 following the discovery of human remains during construction. Rocky Point was part of the Tulalip Indian Reservation when it was established following the 1855 Treaty of Point Elliott, in which the Snohomish ceded most of their lands.

The Missionary Oblates of Mary Immaculate, a French Catholic missionary congregation, established a residential school for indigenous children on the Tulalip Reservation in 1857. Father Eugene Casimir Chirouse chose a site at Rocky Point, which was renamed Priest Point, and a log house was constructed for the Mission of St. Anne's. It was moved to a new hillside location on modern-day Meridian Avenue with an adjacent cemetery. The residential school received federal funding and remained at Priest Point until it was destroyed by a fire in 1902 and replaced by a new campus near Mission Beach. Approximately two dozen unmarked graves at the Priest Point Cemetery have the remains of children who died at the residential school.

== Geography ==
Priest Point is a spit that juts into Port Gardner at the mouth of the Snohomish River. It is southeast of Tulalip Bay on the Tulalip Indian Reservation, which is located west of Marysville, Washington.

According to the United States Census Bureau, the CDP has a total area of 3.0 square miles (7.7 km^{2}), of which, 0.6 square miles (1.7 km^{2}) of it is land and 2.3 square miles (6.0 km^{2}) of it (78.38%) is water.

== Demographics ==
As of the census of 2000, there were 779 people, 318 households, and 235 families residing in the CDP. The population density was 1,209.1 people per square mile (470.0/km^{2}). There were 344 housing units at an average density of 533.9/sq mi (207.5/km^{2}). The racial makeup of the CDP was 82.16% White, 0.64% African American, 12.58% Native American, 0.77% Asian, 0.13% Pacific Islander, 0.26% from other races, and 3.47% from two or more races. Hispanic or Latino of any race were 1.67% of the population.

There were 318 households, out of which 28.3% had children under the age of 18 living with them, 59.7% were married couples living together, 8.8% had a female householder with no husband present, and 26.1% were non-families. 20.4% of all households were made up of individuals, and 8.2% had someone living alone who was 65 years of age or older. The average household size was 2.45 and the average family size was 2.80.

In the CDP, the age distribution of the population shows 20.4% under the age of 18, 6.0% from 18 to 24, 25.2% from 25 to 44, 32.9% from 45 to 64, and 15.5% who were 65 years of age or older. The median age was 44 years. For every 100 females, there were 102.3 males. For every 100 females age 18 and over, there were 94.4 males.

The median income for a household in the CDP was $52,344, and the median income for a family was $59,327. Males had a median income of $51,184 versus $28,333 for females. The per capita income for the CDP was $26,322. About 5.7% of families and 6.9% of the population were below the poverty line, including 15.3% of those under age 18 and 3.1% of those age 65 or over.
