= Dave Stachelski =

American football player (born 1977)

No. 89
- Position: Tight end

Personal information
- Born: March 1, 1977 (age 49); Chicago, Illinois, U.S.
- Listed height: 6 ft 3 in (1.91 m)
- Listed weight: 250 lb (113 kg)

Career information
- High school: Marysville Pilchuck (Marysville, Washington)
- College: Boise State
- NFL draft: 2000: 5th round, 141st overall pick

Career history
- New England Patriots (2000)*; New Orleans Saints (2000–2001)
- * Offseason or practice squad member only

Career NFL statistics
- Games played: 9
- Stats at Pro Football Reference

Dave Stachelski (born March 1, 1977) is an American former professional football player who was a tight end for the New Orleans Saints of the National Football League (NFL). He was selected 141st overall by the New England Patriots in the fifth round of the 2000 NFL draft. He played college football for the Boise State Broncos.
