= Legacy High School (Marysville, Washington) =

Coordinates: 48°03′43″N 122°11′56″W

Location
- 7204 27th Ave NE; Marysville, Washington 98271; United States

Information
- Type: Public, choice secondary school
- Established: 2003
- School district: Marysville School District
- Principal: Au’Yana Lee
- Grades: 9-12
- Enrollment: 143 (2024-2025)
- Colors: blue, silver and black
- Mascot: Lemur
- Website: Legacy High School website

Legacy High School is a public secondary school for grades 9-12 and is part of the Marysville School District. It is located on the Tulalip reservation. Legacy High School, formerly Marysville Mountain View Arts and Technology High School, was formed when Marysville Arts and Technology High School merged with Mountain View High School. Legacy High School shares its campus with Heritage High School and Tenth Street Middle School.
