= St. Anne's Roman Catholic Church (Marysville, Washington) =

Historic church in Washington, United States

- U.S. National Register of Historic Places
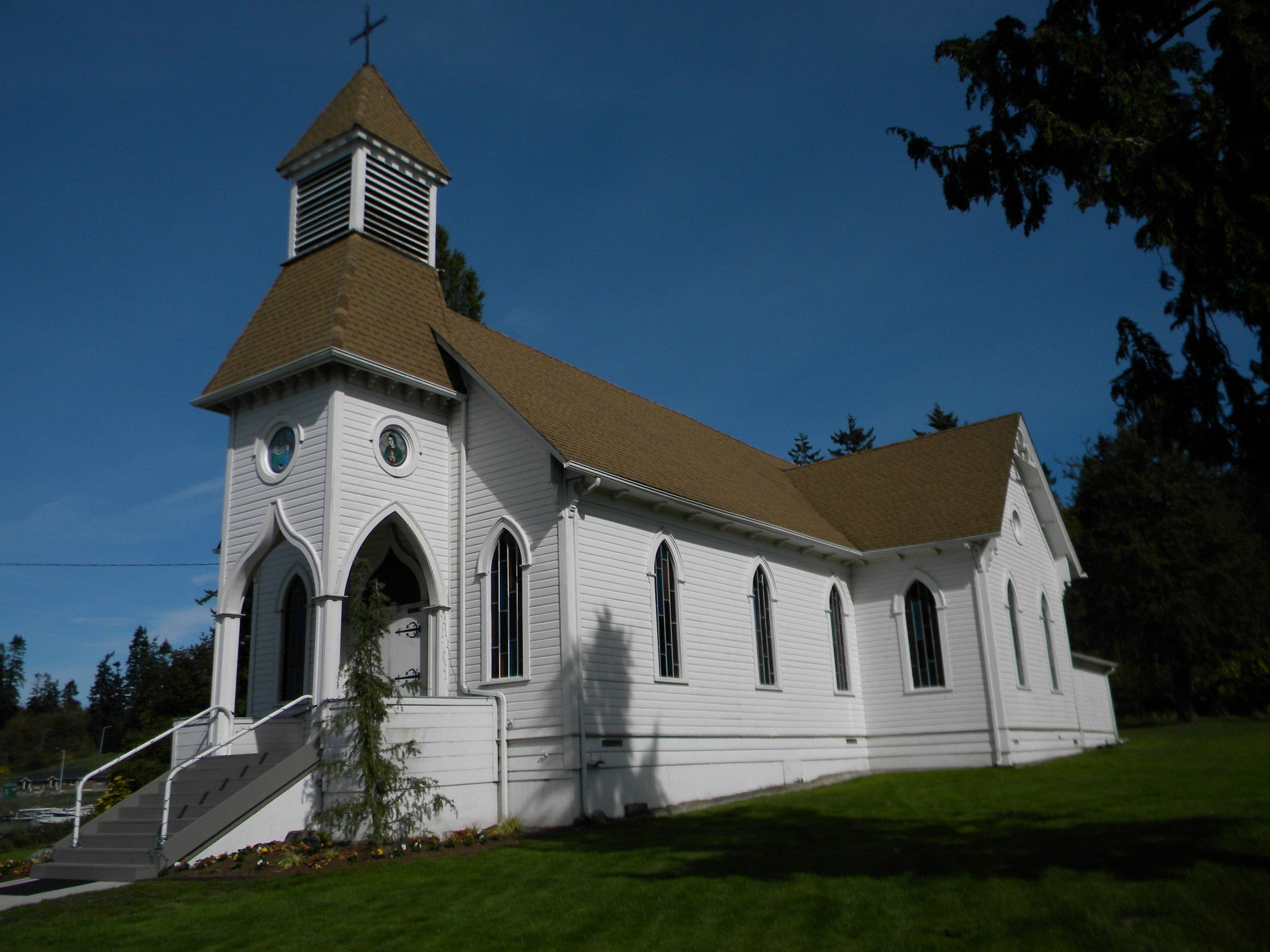
- Saint Anne's Catholic Church

- Location within Washington (state)
- Nearest city: Marysville, Washington
- Coordinates: 48°3′43″N 122°16′34″W
- Area: 1.5 acres (0.61 ha)
- Built: 1904
- Architectural style: Gothic
- NRHP reference No.: 76001911
- Added to NRHP: June 18, 1976

St. Anne's Roman Catholic Church is a historic church at 7231 Totem Beach Road in Tulalip, Washington, United States. It was built in 1904 and added to the National Register of Historic Places in 1976.
