= John McCoy (American politician) =

American politician (1943–2023)

- lulilaš

Member of the Washington Senate from the 38th district
- In office November 27, 2013 – April 17, 2020
- Preceded by: Nick Harper
- Succeeded by: June Robinson

Member of the Washington House of Representatives from the 38th district
- In office January 13, 2003 – November 27, 2013
- Preceded by: Aaron Reardon
- Succeeded by: June Robinson

Personal details
- Born: John Richard McCoy; October 29, 1943 Tulalip, Washington, U.S.
- Died: June 6, 2023 (aged 79)
- Party: Democratic
- Spouse: Janet Jean McCoy (m. 1965)
- Children: 3
- Education: El Capitan High School
- Profession: Quil Ceda Village general manager; White House computer technician
- Website: Official website

Military service
- Branch/service: United States Air Force
- Years of service: 1961–1981

John Richard McCoy (Lushootseed: lulilaš, October 29, 1943 – June 6, 2023) was a Tulalip politician of the Democratic Party based in the state of Washington. In 2013, he was appointed to the State Senate to fill a vacancy and represent the 38th Legislative District. He previously served more than 10 years in the Washington House of Representatives (2003–2013).

McCoy was the only self-identified Native American in the State Senate. In 2013, along with Jeff Morris (Tsimshian), he was one of the two Native Americans in the state legislature.

== Early life and professional career ==
McCoy was born into a Tulalip family on the Tulalip Indian Reservation in Washington. His Lushootseed name was lulilaš. He attended local schools.

McCoy spent 20 years in the Air Force before retiring in 1981. He then became a computer technician at the White House, before leaving to start a career in the private sector.

McCoy would later become active in tribal affairs. He served as general manager of Quil Ceda Village, the tribe's new municipality established in 2001. It included a gaming casino and business park. In 2005 the tribe also opened a 125-store retail outlet, all part of its efforts to diversify the tribe's economy and provide new jobs.

== Political career ==
McCoy joined the Democratic Party and became active. In 2002 he ran for office as state representative and won. He served from 2003 to 2013, being re-elected several times.

In his fifth term in the state legislature, McCoy gained passage of a bill to establish a procedure "for the state to cede jurisdiction over criminal and civil matters on tribal lands to federal and tribal governments." In 2013 he was chairman of the Community Development, Housing and Tribal Affairs Committee; vice chairman of the Environment Committee; and member of the Education Committee.

McCoy also served as chairman of the executive committee of the National Caucus of Native American State Legislators; there are 79 Native legislators in 18 states.

On November 27, 2013, the Snohomish County Council selected McCoy to fill the vacancy left when Senator Nick Harper resigned. McCoy was the leading vote-getter of the Democratic Precinct Committee Officers in Washington's 38th Legislative District. He retired from the State Senate on April 17, 2020, citing concerns about his health, and was succeeded by appointee June Robinson.

== Personal life ==
McCoy had three daughters with his wife Jeannie; the family also had 10 grandchildren and five great-grandchildren as of 2023. He died on June 6, 2023, at home in Tulalip.

== Awards and honors ==
McCoy received the 2009 Fuse "Sizzle" Award. He was honored with the Strong Man Award for defending a citizens' clean energy initiative–Initiative-937–from major rollbacks. He brought two sides of the legislature together on the issue to reach a workable compromise.
