= Northside USA =

- Company type: Subsidiary
- Industry: Footwear
- Founded: 1985 in Portland, Oregon
- Founders: Jim and Helen Thayer
- Headquarters: Marysville, Washington
- Owner: Jack Wolfin; Jeff Thayer; Bob Thayer
- Number of employees: 51 (2016)
- Parent: Triple T Trading
- Website: northsideusa.com

Northside USA is an American footwear company based in Marysville, Washington. Northside, a subsidiary of Triple T Trading, was founded in 1985 and sells shoes in retail stores in the United States and China. The company's shoes, marketed towards "light outdoor recreation", are designed in the United States and manufactured in China.

== History ==
Triple T Trading was founded by Jim and Helen Thayer in 1985 as a wholesale operation in Portland, Oregon. The Thayers, who had previously operated a chain of Portland-area children's retail stores called Whippersnappers, eventually moved into importing shoes from factories in China and Taiwan.

The Thayers, joined by their sons Jeff and Bob and Jack Wolfin, developed the "Northside" brand in 2000 and relocated their business from Tukwila, Washington to Marysville in 2003. The company moved to a new, custom-built 110,000 sq ft (10,000 m^{2}) warehouse in northern Marysville in July 2016.

== Sales ==
Northside USA sells its products to retailers across the United States and Canada, including Northwestern chain Fred Meyer and Seattle-based online retailer Amazon.com. The company announced in September 2016 that it would begin selling shoes to retailers in China.

Northside USA markets its footwear for the "lighter side of recreation" and adopted the tagline "Just for Fun" in 2013.

== Philanthropy ==
Northside USA partnered with Soles4Souls in 2011 to donate shoes to charity through an online promotion. Northside USA also donated 500 pairs of shoes to the Rainier Vista Boys and Girls Club in Seattle in partnership with Project Sole in 2015.
