= Marysville, Washington =

City in Washington, United States

Marysville
- City
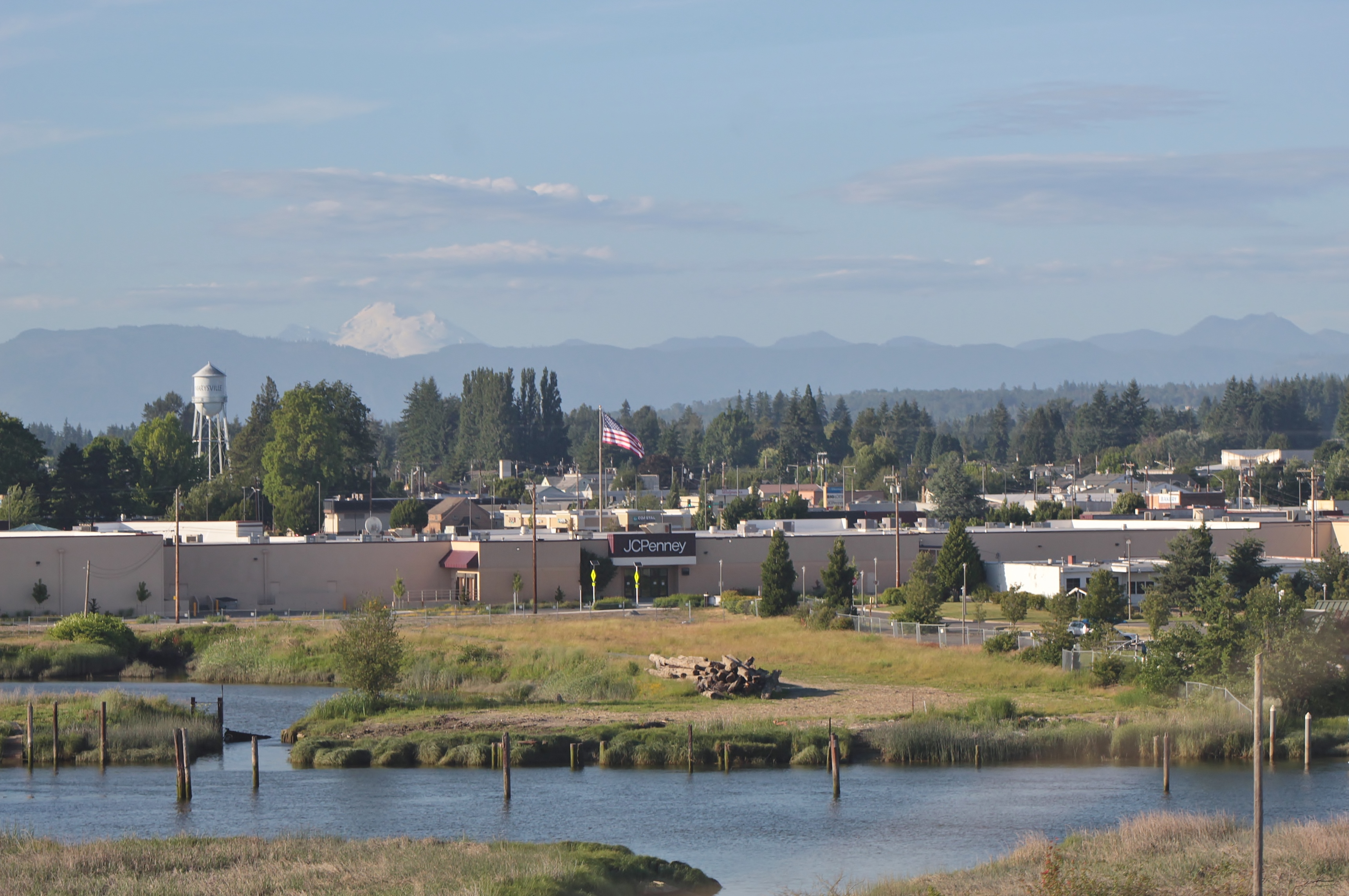
- Downtown Marysville seen from Interstate 5

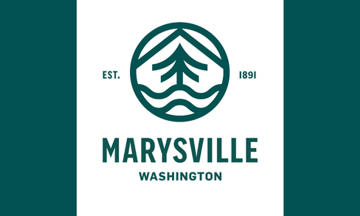
- Flag Seal
- Nickname: The Strawberry City
- Interactive map of Marysville
- Coordinates: 48°3′46″N 122°9′48″W
- Country: United States
- State: Washington
- County: Snohomish
- Founded: 1872
- Incorporated: March 20, 1891

Government
  - Type: Mayor–council
  - Mayor: Jon Nehring

Area
  - Total: 21.06 sq mi (54.54 km^{2})
  - Land: 20.75 sq mi (53.75 km^{2})
  - Water: 0.31 sq mi (0.79 km^{2})
- Elevation: 20 ft (6 m)

Population (2020)
  - Total: 70,714
  - Estimate (2024): 76,209
  - Rank: US: 498th
  - Density: 3,387.3/sq mi (1,307.85/km^{2})
- Time zone: UTC−8 (PST)
  - Summer (DST): UTC−7 (PDT)
- ZIP Codes: 98270–98271
- Area code: 360, 564
- FIPS code: 53-43955
- GNIS feature ID: 1512435
- Website: marysvillewa.gov

Marysville is a city in Snohomish County, Washington, United States, part of the Seattle metropolitan area. The city is located 35 miles (56 km) north of Seattle, adjacent to Everett on the north side of the Snohomish River delta. It is the second-largest city in Snohomish County after Everett, with a population of 70,714 at the time of the 2020 U.S. census.

Marysville was established in 1872 as a trading post by James P. Comeford, but was not populated by other settlers until 1883. After the town was platted in 1885, a period of growth brought new buildings and industries to Marysville. In 1891, Marysville was incorporated and welcomed the completed Great Northern Railway. Historically, the area has subsisted on lumber and agrarian products; the growth of strawberry fields in Marysville led to the city being nicknamed the "Strawberry City" in the 1920s.

The city experienced its first wave of suburbanization in the 1970s and 1980s, resulting in the development of new housing and commercial areas. Between 1980 and 2000, the population of Marysville increased fivefold. In the early 2000s, annexations of unincorporated areas to the north and east expanded the city to over 20 square miles (52 km^{2}) and brought the population over 60,000.

Marysville is oriented north–south along Interstate 5, bordering the Tulalip Indian Reservation to the west, and State Route 9 to the east. Mount Pilchuck, whose 5,300-foot-high (1,600 m) peak can be seen from various points in the city, appears in the city's flag and seal.

== History ==
=== Foundation and early history ===
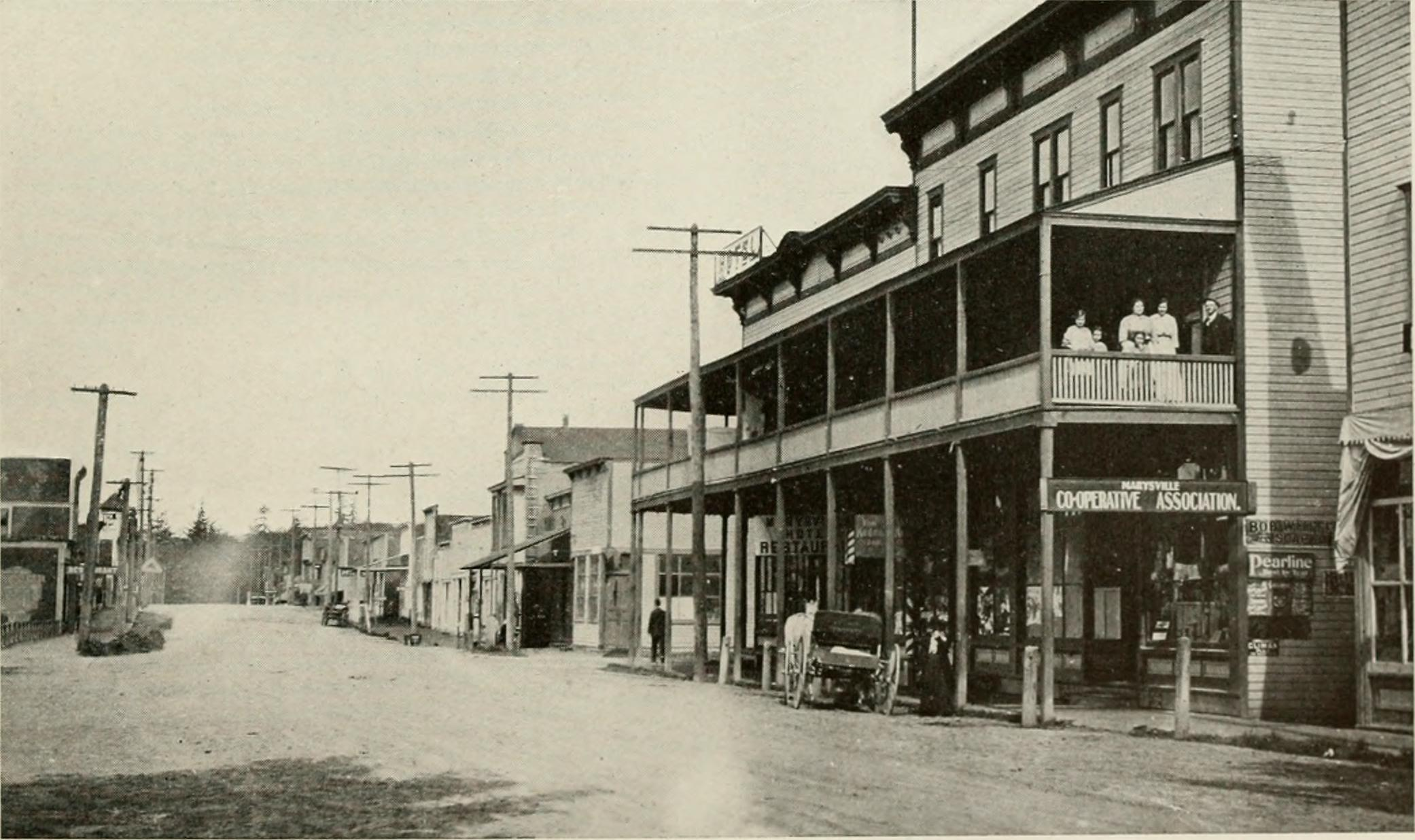
Front Street in Marysville, pictured in 1912

Marysville was established in 1872 by government-appointed Indian agent James P. Comeford, an Irish immigrant who had served in the Civil War, and his wife Maria as a trading post on the Tulalip Indian Reservation. The reservation, located to the west of modern-day Marysville, was established by the Point Elliot Treaty of 1855, signed by local Native American tribes and territorial governor Isaac Stevens at modern-day Mukilteo. The treaty's signing opened most of Snohomish County to American settlement and commercial activities, including logging, fishing and trapping. The modern name for Marysville in the indigenous Lushootseed language, spoken by the Coast Salish peoples, is sɬəp̓qs.

Timber harvesting was the largest active industry in the area during the 1860s and 1870s, with cleared hillsides in modern-day Marysville later replaced by dairy farms. The Comefords' trading post accepted business from the reservation and logging camps that were established near the mouth of the Snohomish River. In 1874, Comeford acquired three timber claims from local loggers for $450, totaling 1,280 acres (5.2 km^{2}), and cleared the land in preparation for settlement. Comeford and his wife moved to the present site of Marysville in 1877, building a new store and wharf. Although Marysville remained a one-man town until 1883, a post office and school district were both established by 1879 using the names and signatures of Native American neighbors of Comeford's, who were given "Boston" names for the petition. Comeford completed construction of a two-story hotel in 1883 to welcome new settlers from outside the region.

The origin of the settlement's name, Marysville, remains disputed. According to the Marysville Historical Society, it was to be named Mariasville for Maria Comeford, but was changed to Marysville after the postal department identified a similarly named town in Idaho. Among the first residents to arrive in the area in the 1880s were James Johnson and Thomas Lloyd, who allegedly suggested that the town be named for their previous home of Marysville, California. Comeford sold his store and wharf to settlers Mark Swinnerton and Henry B. Myers in 1884, and moved north to the Kellogg Marsh (now part of Marysville) to farm 540 acres (220 ha) of land he purchased.

Marysville was formally platted on February 25, 1885, filed by the town physician J. D. Morris and dedicated by the Comefords. More settlers began to arrive after the completion of the town's first sawmill in 1887, joined by three others by the end of the decade. Marysville was officially incorporated as a fourth-class city on March 20, 1891, with a population of approximately 400 residents and Mark Swinnerton serving as the city's first mayor. The Great Northern Railway also completed construction of its tracks through Marysville in 1891, building a drawbridge over Ebey Slough and serving the city's sawmills. A newspaper named the Marysville Globe was established by Thomas P. Hopp in 1892, replacing an earlier one named the Leader that had gone bankrupt shortly after its debut two years beforehand.

=== Early 20th century ===
By the turn of the century, the city's population had grown to 728, and social organizations began to establish themselves in Marysville, including a lodge of the Independent Order of Odd Fellows and a Crystal Lodge of the Free and Accepted Masons. The first city hall was opened in late 1901, at a cost of $2,000; the building also housed the city's fire department, and later the first public library in 1907. Electrical and water supply systems were both inaugurated in 1906, alongside the construction of a high school building.

The timber industry in Marysville peaked in 1910, at which point the city's population reached 1,239, with 10 sawmills producing lumber on the shores of Ebey Slough. Agriculture began to grow in Marysville, with its fertile land suited for the growing of strawberries in particular. By 1920, the city had more than 2,000 acres (810 ha) of strawberry fields, leading to the coining of the city's nickname of "Strawberry City" and the establishment of the annual Strawberry Festival in 1932.

An automobile bridge across Ebey Slough and the Snohomish River estuary to Everett was completed in 1927, with funding from the state department of highways to complete the Pacific Highway (later part of U.S. Route 99, and present-day State Route 529). The city remained relatively unchanged through the Great Depression, with the diversity of industries credited for Marysville avoiding the worst of economic hardship experienced by other nearby communities. During World War II, an ammunition depot was built on the Tulalip Reservation near present-day Quil Ceda, later being re-used as a Boeing test site after the aerospace company expanded in Everett.

=== Late 20th century ===
Marysville began to grow into a bedroom community of Seattle and Everett in the late 1950s, spurred by the completion of Interstate 5 in stages from 1954 to 1969. The new freeway bypassed the town, causing a minor decline in tourist revenue at businesses that later rebounded to previous levels, also eliminating a major traffic bottleneck that paralyzed the city's downtown. The city annexed its first area outside its original city limits in 1954, growing to over 2,500 residents. Marysville was re-classified as a third-class city in March 1962 and the local Chamber of Commerce boosted the city during the Century 21 Exposition held in nearby Seattle, hosting a UFO exposition in Smokey Point that summer.

On June 6, 1969, a freight train operated by Great Northern rammed into several disconnected train cars in front of the Marysville depot, destroying the building, killing two men in an engine on a nearby siding and injuring two others. The crash, blamed on the engineer failing to adhere to the track's speed limit, caused $1 million in damage to railroad property and resulted in the demolition of the depot, which had served the city since 1891 and was not rebuilt.

After the initial wave of suburbanization, which built homes in former strawberry fields to the north and east of Marysville, the city's population totaled 5,544 in 1980. The city's growth was concentrated in outlying areas, leaving downtown to weaken economically. In 1981, the Marysville City Council declared that the downtown area was "blighted" and in need of a facelift. The council presented a $30 million urban renewal plan in November 1982 that would add new retail and office space, mixed-use development, public parks and improve pedestrian conditions in downtown, along with a large public parking lot and an expanded public marina. The plan was opposed by the marina's owner and other downtown property owners and produced lengthy public hearings that lasted until the following year. Mayor Daryl Brennick vetoed the plan in June 1983, citing public outcry and the high cost of the proposal, and the city council failed to overturn the decision. The city instead developed a downtown shopping mall that involved the demolition of a water tower (one of two in the city) and several historic buildings in 1987. The $17 million mall opened in August 1988 with 24 stores and 180,000 square feet (17,000 m^{2}) of retail space.

Marysville underwent further population changes in the late 1980s and 1990s, continuing to build more housing and new retail centers after the lifting of a building moratorium. The city continued to annex outlying areas, growing to a size of 9.8 square miles (25 km^{2}) and population of 25,315 by 2000. Marysville also saw a thrice-fold increase in the number of businesses from 1991 to 1996 and was close to eclipsing Edmonds in retail sales. The decade also saw the construction of new schools, a YMCA facility, a library, and a renovated senior center at Comeford Park. The Tulalip Tribes opened its first casino in 1992, the second Indian casino in the state, and began development of a large shopping mall at Quil Ceda Village in the early 2000s.

Marysville attempted to attract regional facilities in the late 1990s and 2000s, with varying degrees of success. The U.S. Navy opened Naval Station Everett in Everett in 1994, which was accompanied by a support annex in northern Marysville near Smokey Point the following year. The Puget Sound Regional Council explored the expansion of Arlington Municipal Airport into a regional airport in the 1990s to relieve Seattle–Tacoma International Airport, but decided instead to build a third runway at Sea-Tac because of existing traffic and local opposition. In September 2004, Marysville won a bid to build a 850-acre (340 ha) NASCAR racetrack (to be operated by the International Speedway Corporation) near Smokey Point. The project was cancelled two months later after concerns about traffic impacts, environmental conditions, and $70 million in required transportation improvements arose. The NASCAR site was later pitched as a candidate for a new University of Washington satellite campus (known as UW North Sound) in the late 2000s, competing with a site in downtown Everett. The project was put on hold in 2008 after continued disagreements over the campus's location, before being cancelled entirely in 2011, replaced by a new Washington State University branch campus in Everett.

=== 21st century ===
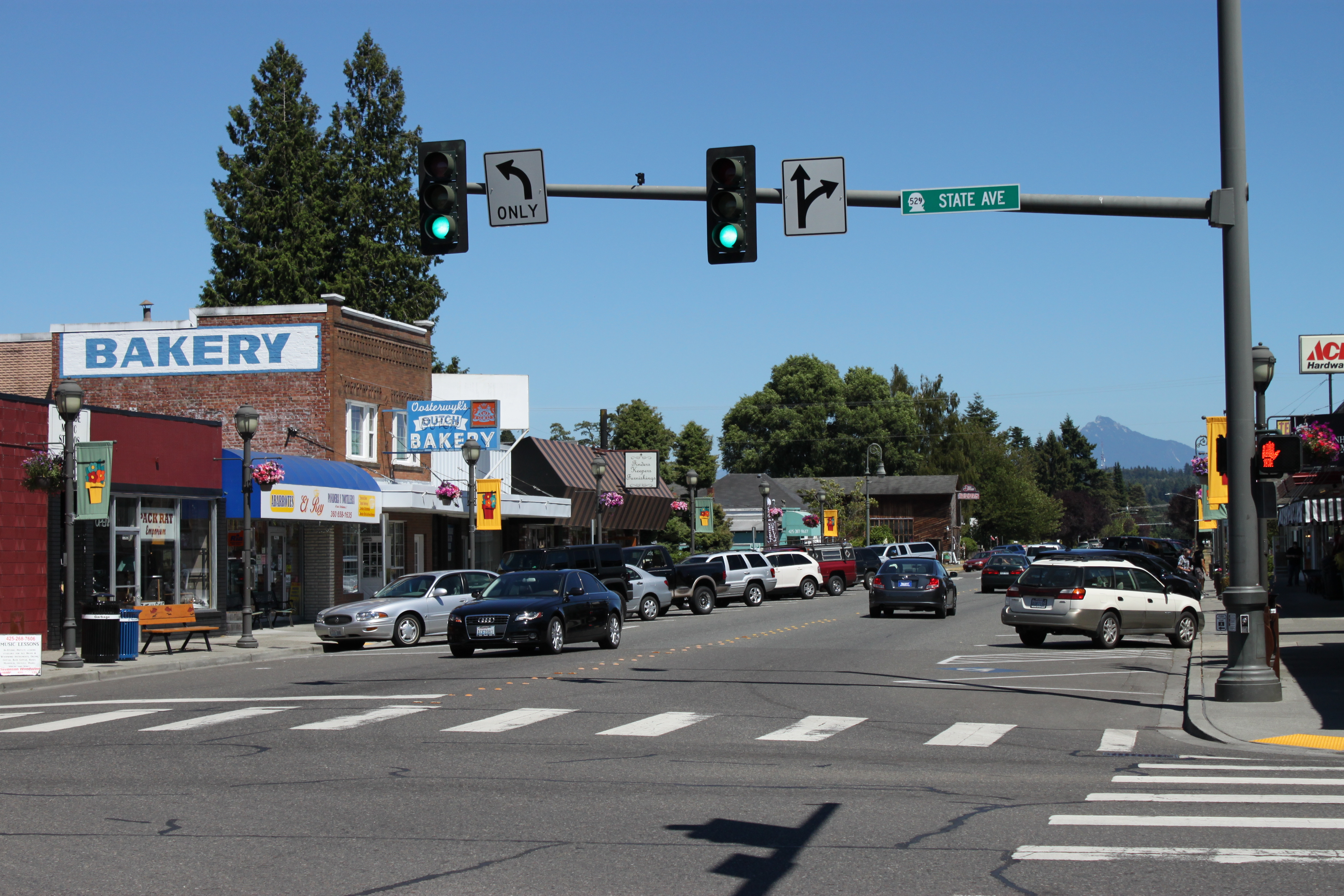
3rd Street in downtown Marysville

From 2000 to 2006, the city annexed 23 additional areas, totaling 1,416 acres (573 ha), lengthening the city to border Arlington at Smokey Point. The largest single annexation came in 2009, with Marysville absorbing 20,000 residents and 2,847 acres (1,152 ha) from North Marysville, an unincorporated area that comprised the majority of the urban growth area. New retail centers in North Lakewood and at 116th Street were built in 2007, leading to increased sales tax revenue for the city and increased traffic congestion in areas of the city.

The opening of the city's waterfront park and public boat launch in 2005 spurred interest in redevelopment of downtown Marysville. The closure of the final waterfront sawmill in 2005, followed by its acquisition and demolition by the city in 2008, led city planners to propose a downtown master plan. The 20-year plan, released and adopted by the City Council in 2009, proposed the redevelopment of the Marysville Towne Center Mall into a mixed-use, pedestrian-oriented area with a restored street grid. The waterfront area would include trails, residential buildings, and retail spaces, along with a new city hall and civic center. The city government acquired several parcels in the waterfront in the 2010s with the intent of partnering with a private developer. In 2015, the city of Marysville was also the recipient of grants and consultation from the Environmental Protection Agency's smart growth program, identifying strategies for infill development in downtown.

By 2010, Marysville had grown to a population of 60,020 and surpassed Lynnwood and Edmonds to become the second-largest city in Snohomish County. In 2015, the city grew at a rate of 2.5 percent, the largest rate of any city in Washington state. New housing and industrial areas are under construction and planned to fuel further population growth in Marysville. The city's school district opened a second high school, Marysville Getchell, in 2010 to serve students living in the eastern area of Marysville. The school previously consisted of four Small Learning Communities which share the same campus and athletics programs. On October 24, 2014, the cafeteria of Marysville Pilchuck High School was the site of a school shooting, in which five students (including the perpetrator) were killed and another was left seriously injured. The shooting garnered national attention amidst a debate about gun violence and gun restrictions. The cafeteria was closed for the rest of the school year and replaced by a new building opened in January 2017, funded by $8.3 million from the state legislature and school district.

== Geography ==
According to the United States Census Bureau's 2010 census, Marysville has a total area of 20.94 square miles (54.2 km^{2})—20.68 square miles (53.6 km^{2}) of land and 0.26 square miles (0.67 km^{2}) of water. The city is located in the northwestern part of Snohomish County in Western Washington, approximately 35 miles (56 km) north of Seattle. Marysville's city limits are generally bound to the south by Ebey Slough (part of the Snohomish River delta) and Soper Hill Road, to the west by Interstate 5 and the Tulalip Indian Reservation, to the north by the city of Arlington, and to the east by the Centennial Trail and State Route 9. The city's urban growth boundary includes 158 acres (64 ha) outside of city limits, bringing the total area to 21.14 square miles (54.8 km^{2}).

The city's topography varies from the low-lying downtown, located along the banks of Ebey Slough 5 feet (1.5 m) above sea level, rising to 160 feet (49 m) near Smokey Point and over 465 feet (142 m) in the eastern highlands. Marysville sits in the watershed of two major creeks, Quilceda Creek and Allen Creek, and approximately 70 minor streams that flow into Ebey Slough and Snohomish River. During the early 20th century, repeated controlled flooding and other engineering works in the Snohomish River delta contributed to the replenishment of the area's fertile silty soil for use in farming.

The Marysville skyline is dominated by views of Mount Pilchuck and the Cascade Mountains to the east and the Olympic Mountains to the west. The 5,324-foot (1,623 m) Mount Pilchuck appears on the city's logo and flag, and is the namesake of the Marysville Pilchuck High School.

The City of Marysville's comprehensive plan defines 11 general neighborhoods within the city and its urban growth boundary: Downtown, Jennings Park, Sunnyside, East Sunnyside/Whiskey Ridge, Cedarcrest/Getchell Hill, North Marysville/Pinewood, Kellogg Marsh, Marshall/Kruse, Shoultes, Smokey Point, and Lakewood.

== Demographics ==
Historical population
Census	Pop.	Note	%±
1890	262		—
1900	728		177.9%
1910	1,239		70.2%
1920	1,244		0.4%
1930	1,354		8.8%
1940	1,748		29.1%
1950	2,259		29.2%
1960	3,117		38.0%
1970	4,343		39.3%
1980	5,080		17.0%
1990	10,328		103.3%
2000	25,315		145.1%
2010	60,020		137.1%
2020	70,714		17.8%
2024 (est.)	76,209		7.8%
U.S. Decennial Census

Until the post-World War II population boom of the 1950s, Marysville's population never rose above 2,000 residents, who were all located within the original city limits. The city began annexing surrounding areas in the 1950s, anticipating suburban development that would replace existing farmland and forest lands. From 1950 to 1980, the city doubled in population, growing to over 5,000 residents, with an additional 15,000 residents in surrounding areas. Marysville's population grew five-fold between 1980 and 2000, increasing to 25,000 through natural growth and annexation of developed areas.

From 2000 to 2010, the city's population increased to over 60,000 after the annexation of the urban growth area and continued development, making Marysville the second-largest city in Snohomish County behind Everett. In 2015, Marysville was the fastest-growing city in Washington, growing at a rate of 2.5 percent to an estimated population of 66,773. As of the 2020 U.S. census, Marysville has 70,714 residents and remains the second largest city in Snohomish County as well as the 18th largest in Washington. The United States Census Bureau designates Marysville and the surrounding cities of Arlington, Lake Stevens, and Snohomish as a continuous urbanized area, with a population of 160,440 as of 2020 across 67.8 square miles (176 km^{2}).

The 2024 American Community Survey estimates that the median household income in the city is $103,974 and 65 percent of residents are employed.

=== 2020 census ===
As of the 2020 census, there were 70,714 people and 24,889 households living in Marysville, which had a population density of 3,407.4 inhabitants per square mile (1,315.6/km^{2}). There were 25,723 total housing units, of which 96.8% were occupied and 3.2% were vacant or for occasional use. The racial makeup of the city was 68.1% White, 2.1% Native American and Alaskan Native, 2.6% Black or African American, 7.5% Asian, and 0.8% Native Hawaiian and Pacific Islander. Residents who listed another race were 6.6% of the population and those who identified as more than one race were 12.4% of the population. Hispanic or Latino residents of any race were 14.4% of the population.

Of the 24,889 households in Marysville, 50.9% were married couples living together and 9.1% were cohabitating but unmarried. Households with a male householder with no spouse or partner were 16.1% of the population, while households with a female householder with no spouse or partner were 23.8% of the population. Out of all households, 35.7% had children under the age of 18 living with them and 27.3% had residents who were 65 years of age or older. There were 24,889 occupied housing units in Marysville, of which 67.1% were owner-occupied and 32.9% were occupied by renters.

The median age in the city was 36.2 years old for all sexes, 35.2 years old for males, and 37.4 years old for females. Of the total population, 27.0% of residents were under the age of 19; 28.4% were between the ages of 20 and 39; 31.3% were between the ages of 40 and 64; and 13.3% were 65 years of age or older. The gender makeup of the city was 49.2% male and 50.8% female.

=== 2010 census ===
As of the 2010 census, there were 60,020 people, 21,219 households, and 15,370 families residing in the city. The population density was 2,902.3 inhabitants per square mile (1,120.6/km^{2}). There were 22,363 housing units at an average density of 1,081.4 per square mile (417.5/km^{2}). The racial makeup of the city was 80.0% White, 1.9% African American, 1.9% Native American, 5.6% Asian, 0.6% Pacific Islander, 4.4% from other races, and 5.5% from two or more races. Hispanic or Latino of any race were 10.3% of the population.

There were 21,219 households, of which 40.5% had children under the age of 18 living with them, 53.8% were married couples living together, 12.5% had a female householder with no husband present, 6.2% had a male householder with no wife present, and 27.6% were non-families. 20.9% of all households were made up of individuals, and 7.7% had someone living alone who was 65 years of age or older. The average household size was 2.80 and the average family size was 3.22.

The median age in the city was 34.2 years. 27.5% of residents were under the age of 18; 9.1% were between the ages of 18 and 24; 28.8% were from 25 to 44; 24.7% were from 45 to 64; and 9.9% were 65 years of age or older. The gender makeup of the city was 49.4% male and 50.6% female.

== Economy ==
Largest employers (2025)
Employer	Employees
1. Marysville School District	1,077
2. C&D Zodiac	453
3. City of Marysville	389
4. Smokey Point Behavioral Hospital	249
5. The Everett Clinic	226
6. Walmart	226
7. Echandia	204
8. Safeway	199
9. Costco	193
10. Fred Meyer	190

As of 2024, Marysville has an estimated 39,398 civilian residents who are in the workforce, either employed or unemployed. The largest sectors of employment are educational and health services, manufacturing, and retail trade. Only 9 percent of residents work within Marysville city limits, while the rest commute to other cities. An estimated 20 percent work in Everett, 13 percent in Seattle, 4 percent in Arlington, and under 4 percent in Bellevue. These cities are home to major regional employers such as Boeing, Naval Station Everett, Amazon, and Microsoft. The average one-way commute for Marysville residents is approximately 32 minutes; 70 percent of workers drive alone to their workplace, while 13 percent carpool and 2 percent used public transit. Approximately 14 percent of employed residents worked from home.

Marysville's economy historically relied on lumber production and agriculture, including the cultivation of strawberries, hay and oats. During the Great Depression of the 1930s, Marysville was not adversely impacted unlike other cities in the county and country because of its diverse industries, including sawmills, grain mills, a tannery, a fertilizer plant, and a berry packing plant. The city's largest employer in the early 1950s, the Weiser Lumber Company, was destroyed in a fire on May 6, 1955, causing $300,000 in damage. The lumber mill at the site was later acquired by Welco Lumber, who closed the plant in 2007.

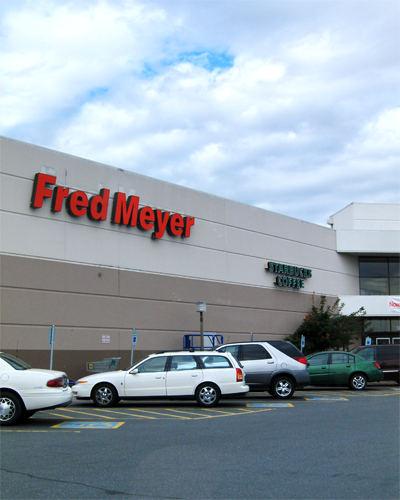
A Fred Meyer grocery store in Marysville

Suburban development and the rise of long-distance commuting in the 1950s led Marysville to transition toward a service-based economy. One of the largest employers of Marysville residents is the Boeing Company and their Everett assembly plant. While farms still operate in the area around the city, since 1980 the lumber industry has all but ceased and is no longer a major factor in the local economy. Since the late 1980s, the economy of Marysville has centered around retail areas, including the downtown Marysville Towne Center Mall (opened in 1987) and the Naval Support Complex (opened in 1995). The Tulalip Tribes built a new casino and new shopping center in the early 2000s to the west of Marysville, contributing to a fall in sales tax revenue. In the latter half of the decade, Marysville opened two large retail centers of its own in the annexed Lakewood neighborhood and at 116th Street NE, bringing additional jobs and sales tax revenue to the city. An auto row along Smokey Point Boulevard in northern Marysville was developed in the late 2010s and is home to several car dealerships.

Marysville is also home to manufacturing companies based in the northern part of the city near Smokey Point and Arlington's industrial center at Arlington Municipal Airport. The cities of Arlington and Marysville lobbied for the creation of the Cascade Industrial Center from the Puget Sound Regional Council, which was approved in 2019. The industrial area is planned to encompass 4,000 acres (1,600 ha) of land between the two cities and support 25,000 jobs by 2040; its first buildings for Amazon, Blue Origin, and other companies were opened in 2022. The city's second-largest employer is C&D Zodiac, an aerospace parts manufacturer tied to Boeing, with 670 employees at an office in northern Marysville. In 2016, outdoor footwear manufacturer Northside USA opened a new headquarters at a 110,000-square-foot (10,000 m^{2}) warehouse in northern Marysville. Space module manufacturer Gravitics has a manufacturing and design facility in Marysville that opened in 2023.

== Government and politics ==
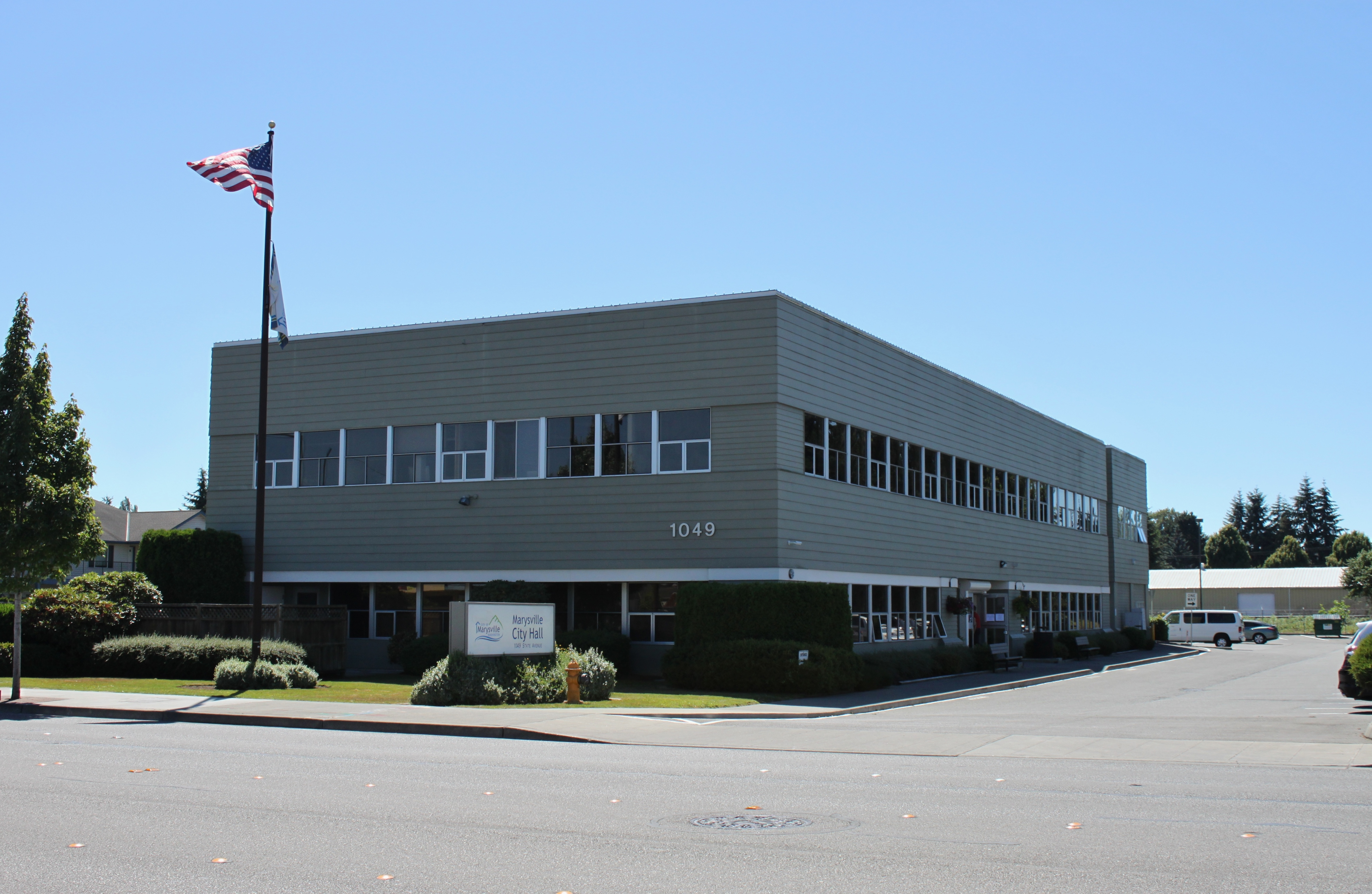
Marysville's former city hall from 2003 to 2022, located on State Avenue

Marysville, a non-charter code city, operates under a mayor–council government with an elected mayor and an elected city council. The mayor serves a term of four years and has been a full-time position since July 1997. A proposal to change to a council–manager government was submitted as a ballot measure in 2002 and rejected by voters. The 32nd and current mayor of Marysville, Jon Nehring, was appointed on June 28, 2010, after the resignation of incumbent Dennis Kendall; Nehring was elected to a full term in November 2011, and re-elected in 2015, 2019, and 2023; he ran unopposed in 2023.

The city council is composed of seven residents who are elected in at-large, non-partisan elections to four-year terms. The elections are staggered, with three positions elected on the same ballot as the mayor, and four positions elected two years later. The council also selects a member to serve as council president for a one-year term. The council meets twice per month, excluding holidays and during the month of August, in the City Council Chambers at the city hall. A proposal to adopt a council–manager government system was defeated by voters in 2002.

According to the Washington State Auditor, Marysville's municipal government employs 266 people and its general fund expenditures totaled $38.7 million in 2015. The 2015–16 biennial budget allocated $128.1 million in expenditures for 2015 and $109.7 million for 2016; general fund spending was limited to $44.1 million in 2015 and $45.1 million. City taxes, collected from retail sales, property assessment, and other sources, accounted for $34.3 million in annual revenue. As of 2024, the combined sales tax rate in Marysville is 9.4 percent, of which 1.3 percent is collected by the city government and its associated transportation benefit district.

The city has several departments providing services to its residents, including a police department, municipal courts, garbage collection, planning and zoning, parks and recreational programs, engineering, street maintenance, water and wastewater services, and stormwater treatment. A new civic campus, combining a police station, city jail, and city hall, was built adjacent to Comeford Park in downtown and opened in October 2022. Marysville contracts with regional districts for other services, including a public library, public transport, electricity, natural gas, and fire protection.

At the federal level, Marysville has been part of the 1st congressional district, represented by Democrat Suzan DelBene, since 2022. The district encompasses parts of Snohomish and King counties between Arlington and Bellevue that generally lie east of Interstate 5. The city lies within two state legislative districts, each with a state senator and two state representatives: the 38th district includes most of the city's southern side along with the Tulalip Indian Reservation and the city of Everett; the 39th district includes the northwestern part of the city and the city of Arlington; and the 44th district includes the southeastern part of the city and the outlying areas of eastern Snohomish and Skagit counties. Marysville is wholly part of the Snohomish County Council's 1st district, which represents most of northern Snohomish County.

== Culture ==
The Red Curtain Foundation for the Arts was founded in 2009 to offer art, music and theatre classes in Marysville, including the staging of community theatre productions. The Red Curtain renovated a former lumber store in 2012 to house a community arts center, but moved in 2015 to a new location at a shopping center in central Marysville in 2015, which will be renovated into a 10,000-square-foot (930 m^{2}) arts center with a 130-seat theatre, classrooms, and other amenities. Other local arts organizations include the Marysville Arts Coalition, and the Sonus Boreal women's choir.

Marysville was formerly home to a children's museum from 1993 to 1995, located at the Marysville Towne Center Mall. The museum relocated to a temporary space in Everett before opening a permanent downtown Everett location in 2004 as the Imagine Children's Museum. The city also hosts a historic telephone museum located in downtown since 1996.

The 1980 made for TV movie Trouble in High Timber Country was filmed in Marysville.

=== Parks and recreation ===
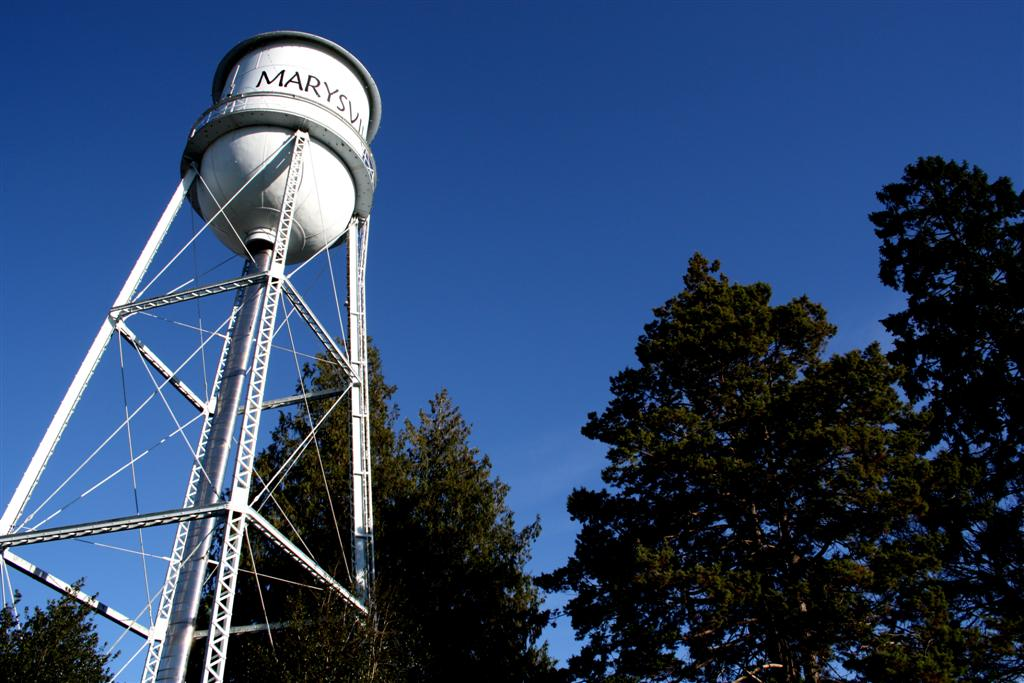
Marysville's historic water tower, located in Comeford Park

The City of Marysville operates and maintains 487.4 acres (197.2 ha) on 35 public recreational facilities within city limits, including parks, playgrounds, sports fields, nature preserves, community centers, a golf course and other facilities.

Comeford Park, located in downtown Marysville and named for town founders James P. Comeford and his wife Maria, is the city's oldest municipal park and is home to the city's landmark water tower, built in 1921 and non-functional since the 1970s. The 120-foot-tall (37 m) water tower, originally accompanied by a second tower demolished in 1987, was planned in the late 1990s to be demolished, but was saved in 2002 after $500,000 was raised by the Marysville Historical Society to renovate and preserve the structure. The 2.1-acre (0.85 ha) Comeford Park is also home to a gazebo donated by the city's Rotary Club, a children's playground, and a spray park that opened in 2014.

Jennings Park, located to the east of downtown Marysville on Armar Road, is considered the centerpiece of the city's park system. The 53-acre (21 ha) park includes play areas, experimental gardens and composting sites, sports fields, a nature walking trail, a preserved barn, and historical exhibits. It is also home to the Park and Recreation Department's administrative offices. The park opened in 1963 on land donated by the Jennings family.

Other major parks in Marysville include the Ebey Waterfront Park and boat launch opened in 2005, and a skate park opened in 2002. Mother Nature's Window Park, originally a privately owned greenspace, was acquired by the county government in 1998 and later annexed into Marysville. It opened in May 2026 after a year of construction to add accessible walkways and other amenities. The city also maintains the Cedarcrest Golf Course in eastern Marysville, an 18-hole, 99.4-acre (40.2 ha) municipal golf course that was established in 1927 and was acquired by the city in 1972. Marysville is also home to private, non-profit recreation facilities operated by the YMCA and Boys and Girls Club, as well as a privately owned bowling alley and indoor roller skating rink.

The Marysville Parks and Recreation Department also organizes youth sports leagues for basketball and soccer. The department uses facilities leased from the Marysville School District, as well as purpose-built areas like the Strawberry Fields Athletic Complex in northern Marysville, a 71-acre (29 ha) park for soccer and disc golf.

=== Events ===
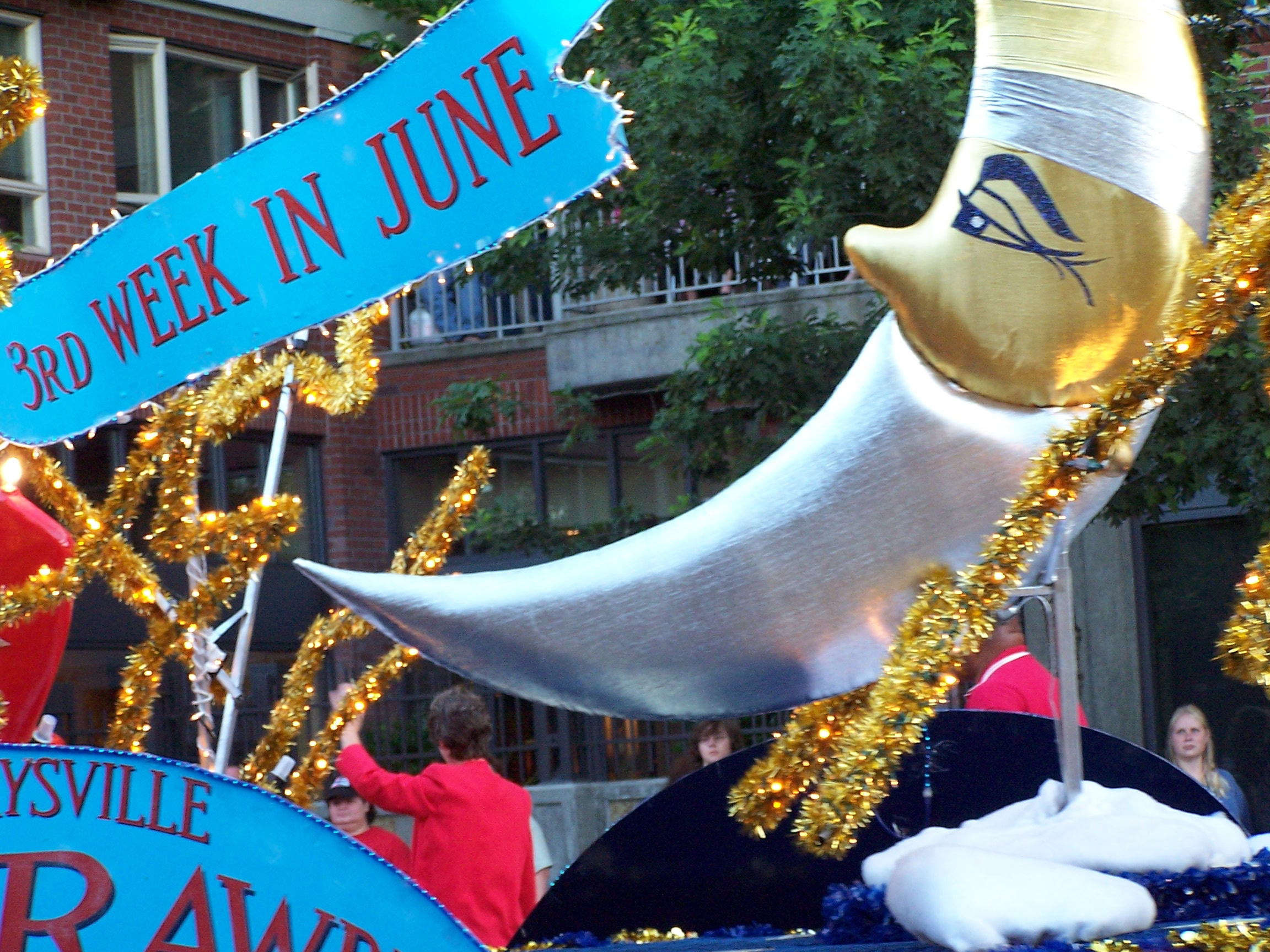
A parade float in the 2007 Strawberry Festival

Marysville holds an annual strawberry festival in the third week of June, which is highlighted by a grand parade on State Avenue and a nighttime fireworks show. The first annual strawberry festival was held in 1932 to celebrate the city's strawberry growing industry, and has only been cancelled during World War II from 1942 to 1945 and a polio outbreak in 1949. The week-long event attracts over 100,000 visitors and is the largest strawberry festival in Washington state. In addition to the Marysville Strawberry Festival, the city holds other annual events, including the Merrysville for the Holidays celebration and grand parade in early December.

The city re-established a farmer's market in 2015, initially in the old city hall's parking lot on State Avenue. The farmer's market was open weekly on Saturdays from July to October and operated by the Allen Creek Community Church. The event moved to 3rd Street in downtown Marysville in June 2023.

=== Media ===
Marysville was formerly home to the Marysville Globe, a weekly newspaper that served northern Snohomish County; it had been published since 1891 and owned by Sound Publishing alongside The Arlington Times. The Globe delivered free newspapers to all Marysville residents from November 28, 2007 until it suspended publication along with the Times in March 2020 in the wake of the COVID-19 pandemic. The North County Outlook was published weekly from September 2007 to October 2022.

The Herald in Everett serves the entire county, including Marysville, and prints daily editions. Marysville is also part of the Seattle–Tacoma media market, and is served by Seattle-based media outlets including The Seattle Times; broadcast television stations KOMO-TV, KING-TV, KIRO-TV, and KCPQ-TV; and various radio stations. The city operates its own government-access television station that typically broadcasts information about city programs and events; it also owns TV3, a public-access television station that is operated by the Marysville School District via students at Marysville Pilchuck High School.

Marysville's public library is part of the Sno-Isle Libraries system, which operates libraries in Island and Snohomish counties; it was annexed into the system in 1968. The library is based in a 23,000-square-foot (2,100 m^{2}) building located on Grove Street that opened on July 27, 1995, to replace a 4,000-square-foot (370 m^{2}) building on the same street that opened in 1978. Recent population growth in northern Marysville near Smokey Point and Lakewood have led to the establishment of a pilot library in the area in 2018, and a recommendation to Sno-Isle to build a permanent branch by 2025.

=== Historical preservation ===
The Marysville Historical Society was formed in 1974 as a non-profit organization to preserve the history of Marysville and its surrounding area. The society began planning the construction of a museum at Jennings Park in 1986, but was unable to raise enough funds to begin construction until 2012. The museum opened on March 19, 2016, coinciding with the 125th anniversary of the city's incorporation, using donated funds to finish construction.

The Marysville and Tulalip area have several properties listed on the National Register of Historic Places (NRHP). The Marysville Opera House was built by the Independent Order of Odd Fellows in 1911 at a cost of $20,000; it would later be listed in 1982 and renovated in 2003 for use by city events. On the Tulalip reservation, the Indian Shaker Church and St. Anne's Roman Catholic Church were built in the early 20th century and listed on the register in 1976; the Tulalip Indian Agency Office, built in 1912, was listed for its significance in tribal affairs as well as the town's founding. Another historic landmark in the area, not listed on the register, is the Gehl House at Jennings Park, a pioneer-era wooden cabin built in 1889 and restored with original furnishings.

=== Sister city ===
Marysville initiated its first sister city relationship in 2017 with Yueqing, a coastal city in the Chinese province of Zhejiang. The two cities have exchanged visits by officials, including tours of manufacturing areas and infrastructure projects.

=== Notable residents ===
Notable people from Marysville include:

- Brady Ballew, soccer player
- Robert A. Brady, economist
- Larry Christenson, baseball player
- Trina Davis, soccer player representing Fiji
- John DeCaro, hockey player
- Jan Haag, writer, artist, poet and filmmaker
- Charles Hamel, oil industry whistle-blower
- Jake Luton, American football player
- Jack Metcalf, U.S. representative from Washington's 2nd congressional district
- Howell Oakdeane Morrison, musician, dance instructor, and entrepreneur, founder of Seattle-based Morrison Records
- Steve Musseau, American football coach
- Haley Nemra, track athlete
- Jeff Pahukoa, American football player
- Shane Pahukoa, American football player
- Jarred Rome, discus thrower
- Patty Schemel, musician with Hole and other bands
- Steve Thompson, American football player
- Emily Wicks, state representative
- Simeon R. Wilson, state politician and newspaper editor

== Education ==
Public schools in Marysville are operated by the Marysville School District, which covers most of the incorporated city and the Tulalip Indian Reservation. The district had an enrollment of approximately 10,804 students in 2013 and has 23 total schools, including two high schools (Marysville Pilchuck and Marysville Getchell), four middle schools, eleven elementary schools, and several alternative learning facilities. The school district was the site of the then-longest teacher strike in Washington state history in 2003, lasting for 49 days until the Snohomish County Superior Court declared the strike illegal.

Other portions of the city are served by the Arlington School District, Lake Stevens School District, and Lakewood School District. Marysville also has one private school, Grace Academy, which was established as a Christian school in 1977 and enrolls 330 students.

Marysville is located near the Everett Community College, the north county region's only post-secondary education institution, situated in north Everett. The college moved its cosmetology school to Marysville in 1996, offering classes and accreditation for students as well as public salon services.

== Infrastructure ==
=== Transportation ===
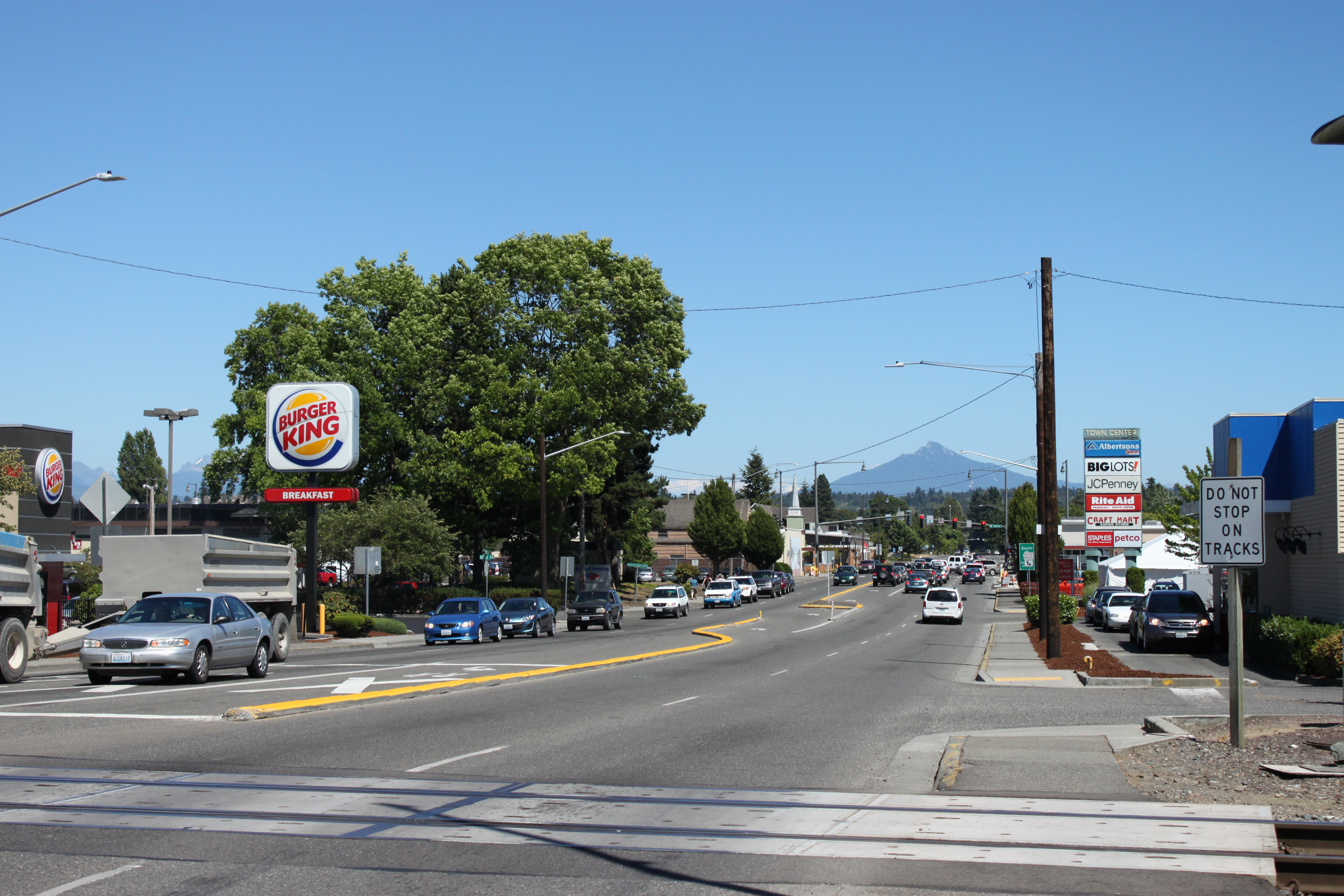
State Route 528 (4th Street) at a railroad crossing in downtown Marysville, looking east towards State Avenue and Mount Pilchuck

Marysville is located along the east side of Interstate 5 (I-5), which connects the city to Vancouver, British Columbia to the north and Seattle to the south. The freeway has four exits serving Marysville, located at 4th Street in Downtown, 88th Street NE near Quil Ceda Village, 116th Street NE near Kruse Junction, and 172nd Street NE near Smokey Point. Several state highways also run within Marysville city limits, including State Route 9, State Route 528 (4th Street and 64th Street), State Route 529 (State Avenue), and State Route 531 (172nd Street NE). The city's primary north–south arterial street, State Avenue, was formerly part of U.S. Route 99 and has been widened and improved in segments since 2000. Other major streets include 51st Avenue NE, 67th Avenue NE, Grove Street, and Sunnyside Boulevard.

Marysville ranks eighth among Washington cities for longest commute times, with an average commute of approximately 30 minutes. The state government began construction in 2023 on a northbound high-occupancy vehicle lane on I-5 and a new interchange at State Route 529 south of downtown to alleviate congestion on east–west railroad crossings in the city. On April 22, 2014, Marysville voters approved the creation of a city transportation benefit district and a 0.2 percent sales tax to fund transportation improvements in the city, including road repairs, bicycle and pedestrian access, and new capital projects.

Public transportation in Marysville and Snohomish County is provided by Community Transit. The agency operates all-day local bus service in Marysville on four routes, connecting to Smokey Point, the Tulalip Indian Reservation, Lake Stevens, Everett and Lynnwood. Community Transit also operates express routes from park and ride facilities in Marysville with all-day service to Lynnwood City Center station and peak hour service to the Boeing Everett Factory. Marysville is one of the largest cities in the metro area excluded from the Sound Transit regional service area, but expressed interest in joining the regional transit authority in the 1990s. The Swift Gold Line, a bus rapid transit route, is planned to connect Everett to Marysville and Smokey Point with a route along State Avenue; it is scheduled to open by 2029. Marysville has also been listed as a candidate for future Sounder commuter rail and Link light rail service.

Marysville is bisected by a north–south railroad operated by BNSF Railway, carrying freight as well as Amtrak Cascades passenger trains that do not stop in Marysville. The nearest passenger rail station is located in Everett, also served by intercity bus service; the Tulalip Tribes listed plans to build a train station at NE 116th Street in Marysville in the 2010s. The railroad, which includes a spur line to serve Arlington, has 23 total level crossings in Marysville that cause traffic congestion on intersecting streets. The nearest municipal airports to Marysville are Arlington Municipal Airport and Paine Field in Everett, while the nearest international airport is Seattle–Tacoma International Airport, 45 miles (72 km) to the south. A private airport and housing development, Frontier Airpark, is located between Marysville and Granite Falls.

Marysville is bisected by the Centennial Trail, a multi-use trail running along the eastern part of the city near State Route 9 between Snohomish and Arlington. The city also has plans to build a 30-mile (48 km) network of trails, including the partially-completed Ebey Slough waterfront trail, under transmission lines in eastern Marysville, and in the Lakewood area.

=== Utilities ===
Electric power in Marysville is provided by the Snohomish County Public Utility District (PUD), a consumer-owned public utility that sources most of its electricity from the federal Bonneville Power Administration (BPA). The BPA operates the region's system of electrical transmission lines, including Path 3, a major national transmission corridor running along the eastern side of Marysville towards British Columbia. Puget Sound Energy provides natural gas to Marysville residents and businesses; two major north–south gas pipelines run through eastern Marysville and are maintained by the Olympic Pipeline Company, a subsidiary of BP, and the Northwest Pipeline Company, a subsidiary of Williams Companies.

The City of Marysville provides municipal solid waste collection and disposal services, while contracting Waste Management for mandatory single-stream recycling and optional yard waste disposal. The municipal government also provides water and wastewater treatment to residents and businesses within city limits and in the surrounding area. Marysville's water system is granted water rights for up to 20.71 million US gallons per day (907,000 L/ks), sourced from the Stillaguamish River, Spada Lake, and a well at Edward Springs near Lake Goodwin. The water system includes several pumping stations and over 297.6 miles (478.9 km) of water pipes. Marysville's wastewater system empties into a wastewater treatment plant south of the city with a daily capacity of 20,143 pounds per day (105.75 kg/ks). The city has 210 miles (340 km) of sewage pipeline and 15 pump stations. Stormwater treatment is also handled by the municipal Public Works Department and consists of 185 miles (298 km) of storm lines, 11,914 storm drains, and 346 detention ponds. The city built a 7-acre (2.8 ha) regional stormwater treatment plant in 2003 and took control of local treatment in 2007. Areas annexed into the city of Marysville are transferred to municipal water and waste services through agreements between the city and the Snohomish County PUD.

Marysville is served by three telecommunications companies that provide cable television, landline telephone, and Internet service: Comcast Xfinity and Astound Broadband (formerly Wave Broadband) service the city using coaxial cable, with the latter primarily present in North Lakewood, whereas Ziply Fiber uses digital subscriber line (DSL) and fiber-optic cable.

=== Health care ===
Marysville does not have a general hospital, but is located near the Providence Regional Medical Center in Everett and Cascade Valley Hospital in Arlington. The city has several community clinics, including two operated by The Everett Clinic and one operated by Providence. A clinic operated by Kaiser Permanente opened in Smokey Point in 2020. A psychiatric hospital in Smokey Point with 115 beds opened in June 2017.
