= Marysville Getchell High School =

Marysville Getchell Campus
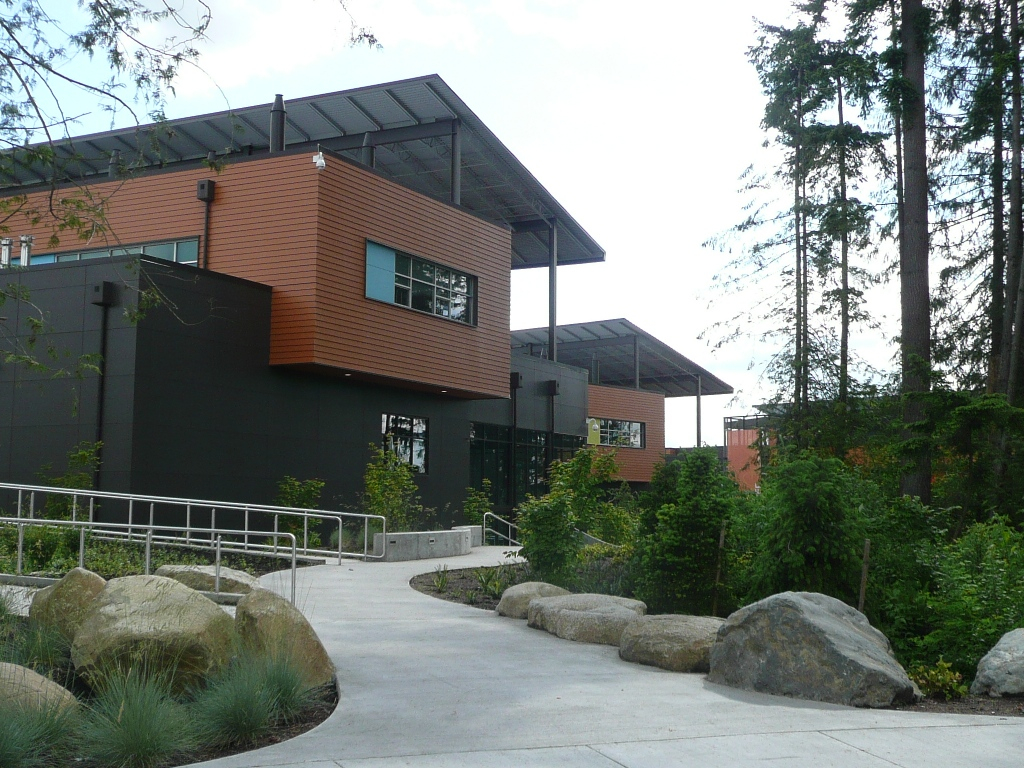

Location
- 8301 84th Street NE; Marysville, Washington 98270; United States; 48°04′27″N 122°07′12″W

Information
- Type: High School
- Motto: Home of the Chargers
- Established: 2010
- School district: Marysville School District
- Principal: Keri Lindsay
- Staff: 56.40 (FTE)
- Grades: 9-12
- Enrollment: 1,498 (2022-2023)
- Student to teacher ratio: 26.56
- Colors: Forest Green, Gold, White & Black
- Mascot: Chargers
- Rival: Marysville Pilchuck High School
- Website: https://www.msd25.org/o/marysville-getchell-high-school

Marysville Getchell High School is a public high school in Marysville, Washington, United States. It is part of the Marysville School District.

The campus has a capacity of 1,600 students and was originally organized into four small learning communities. However, starting in the 2017-2018 school year, the school instead operates with no separation between the four schools. The four schools were previously operated as academies within Marysville Pilchuck High School (MPHS), which had a student population of nearly 3,000 at the time.

The campus was funded by a bond passed in February 2006 and opened in September 2010.

== Facilities ==
The campus spans approximately 192,000 square feet (17,800 m^{2}) across five facilities: one for each building organized with classrooms, plus a shared commons building that accommodates administration, a gymnasium, physical education, a cafeteria, and other services for the campus. To accommodate future expansion, extra classrooms were added to each building and outdoor rooftop decks were designed to permit enclosure.

The school has received several design awards, including the 2011 Council of Educational Facilities Planners International's James D. MacConnell Award, an international award for excellence in school design. The architects for the campus were DLR Group.

== Design ==
The buildings' identities are transmitted through bright-colored accents and subtle graphics. The structures rise from masonry bases, while exposed steel beams and abundant windows create a sense of lightness. The expansive windows provide views between interior spaces and the forests outside. The building exteriors are clad in aluminum, fiber cement board, and high-efficiency glass. Environmentally friendly features include skylights to bring natural light into the building to reduce daytime artificial lighting and using the forest shade and operable windows in lieu of a mechanical cooling system. West of the football field is the remaining evergreen trees in a protected wetland. A natural area to the north of the school still exists as a protected wetland with several mature trees. The buildings have been recognized by the Public Utilities District as being energy efficient. Some features that contribute to lowering overall energy costs are:

• Interior lighting that beats code by 24 percent.

• Interior daylighting features and light fixtures with automatically dimmable ballasts.

• Exterior lighting that utilizes a mix of LED and ceramic metal halide lamps.

• Heating and ventilation measures including variable flow motors and pumps, and vacancy sensors to control fans.

Collectively, these measures represent projected annual savings of nearly 353,000 kilowatt-hours and projected annual savings of $27,705 in electricity costs.
