= Priest (comics) =

Priest, in comics, may refer to:

- Christopher Priest (comic book writer), the nom de plume of an American comics writer, often credited as "Priest"
- Priest, a dark fantasy horror comic series
- Jessica Priest, a character from Spawn
- Priest (DC Comics), a DC Comics character who has appeared in a number of Green Lantern stories
- Priest, a 1996 series from Maximum Press

== See also ==
- Priest (disambiguation)
