= Charles Hamel =

American congressional aide and oil industry whistleblower (1930–2015)

- Born: July 12, 1930; Waterbury, Connecticut, U.S.
- Died: April 9, 2015 (aged 84); Marysville, Washington, United States
- Years active: Congressional aide, oil industry whistle-blower
- Spouse: Kathleen Hamel

Charles "Chuck" Hamel (July 12, 1930 – April 9, 2015) was an American congressional aide and oil industry whistleblower.

== Biography ==
Hamel was a former aide to the late U.S. Senator from Alaska Mike Gravel. He became prominent when he exposed serious illegal environmental practices engaged in by the oil industry in Alaska. He was retaliated against when the industry hired private investigator employees of security firm Wackenhut to spy on and discredit him. Their illicit activities, including wiretapping and a sting operation run by Wayne Black and involving the creation of a bogus environmental advocacy group intended to ferret out the identities of covert corporate whistleblowers, became the subject of congressional hearings. Hamel's efforts were lauded by Alaskans including marine biologist Rick Steiner and environmental consultant Dan Lawn. Hamel was born on July 12, 1930, and grew up in Waterbury, Connecticut. He studied foreign trade at Georgetown University. In the 1970s, he became an oil and shipping broker and worked as a leading oil-industry critic.
