= Tulalip Resort Casino =

Casino and resort in Washington, United States

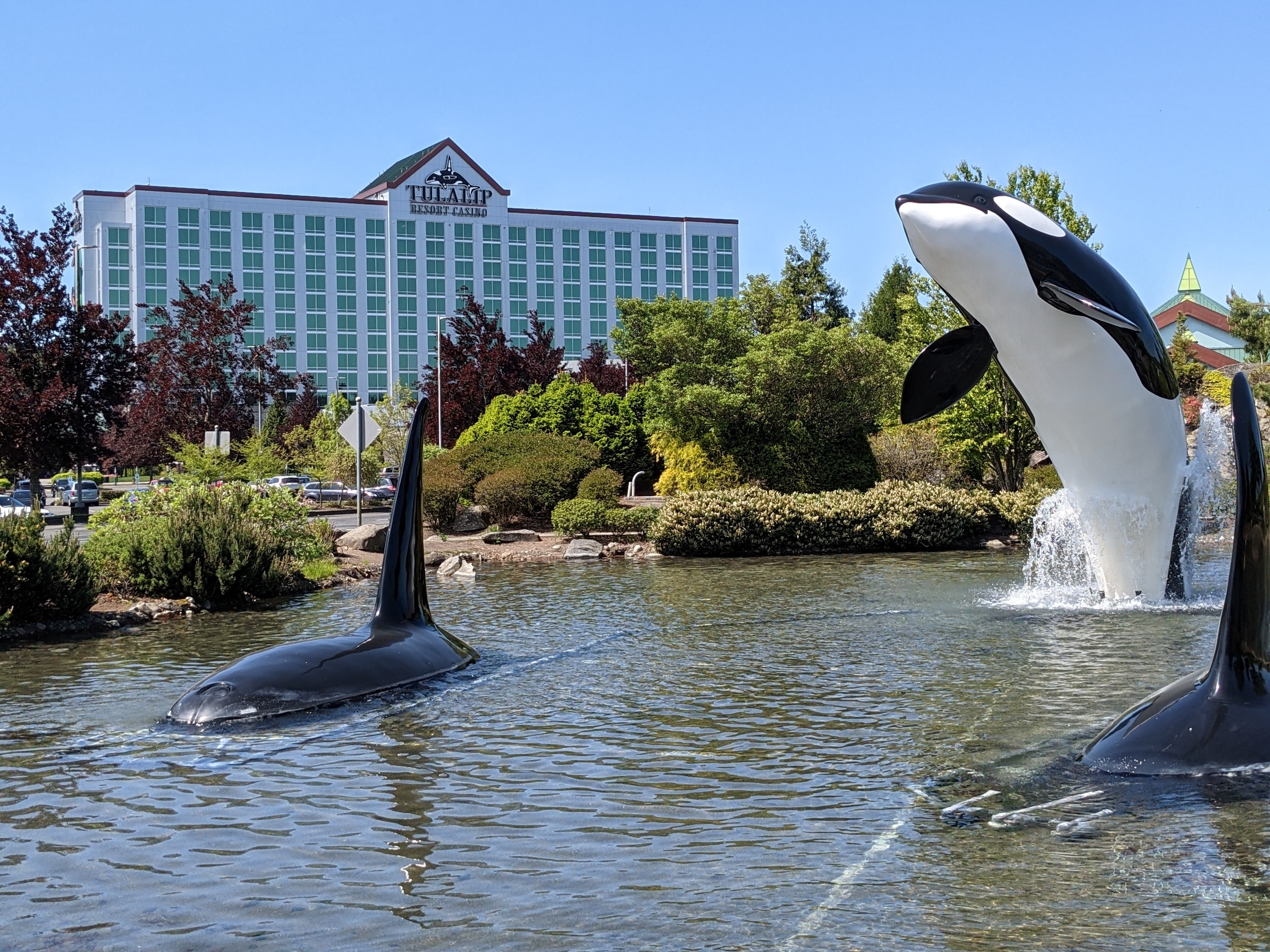
- Interactive map of Tulalip Resort Casino
- Location: Quil Ceda Village, Washington, United States; 10200 Quil Ceda Blvd; 48°05′17″N 122°11′20″W
- Opened: 2003
- Gaming space: 262,000 sq ft (24,300 m^{2})
- Notable restaurants: Blackfish; Cedars Cafe; The Draft Bar and Grill; Journeys East; Canoes Carvery; Blazing Paddles; Tula Bene
- Casino type: Indian
- Owner: Tulalip Tribes of Washington
- Previous names: Tulalip Casino
- Renovated in: 2007-08 (hotel added)
- Website: everythingtulalip.com

Tulalip Resort Casino is an Indian casino and resort in Quil Ceda Village, Washington, owned and operated by the Tulalip Tribes of Washington. It opened in 2003 as the Tulalip Casino and features 270,250 square feet (25,107 m^{2}) of total space and a parking lot with 5,740 stalls. The resort includes 262,000 square feet (24,300 m^{2}) of gaming space, seven restaurants, a spa, and meeting rooms. The outdoor Tulalip Amphitheatre is used for entertainment events.

Construction on the casino began in July 2001 and cost $78 million. The casino opened in June 2003. It replaced an earlier casino that opened in July 1992 and was later renamed to Quil Ceda Creek Casino after a renovation in 2004. A 12-story hotel with 370 rooms was opened on August 15, 2008, shortly after the casino was renamed to the Tulalip Resort Casino; it's one of the tallest buildings in Snohomish County. The hotel was renovated in 2015 and was awarded a four-diamond rating from the American Automobile Association. A northern expansion of the casino began construction in January 2024 and opened in July 2025, adding 70,250 square feet (6,526 m^{2}) of gaming space and 400 additional slot machines. Additional work to open an outdoor covered patio and add designs that referenced the Salish Sea to the casino floor was completed in October 2026.

Since 2022, the casino has hosted an annual display of Christmas lights from late November to early January. The trees around the casino and adjoining areas are covered in 9.7 million lights and is the largest display of its kind in the state. A temporary ice skating rink and indigenous-owned vendor stalls are also part of the event, which draws an estimated 1,000 to 2,000 daily visitors. In 2024, the holiday lights display drew an average of 40,000 to 50,000 vehicles on weekend days.

== See also ==
- List of casinos in Washington
- List of casinos in the United States
- List of casino hotels
