= Tulalip Bay, Washington =

Tulalip Bay, Washington dxʷlilap
- former CDP
- Location of Tulalip Bay, Washington
- Coordinates: 48°3′56″N 122°17′13″W
- Country: United States
- State: Washington
- County: Snohomish

Area
  - Total: 10.7 sq mi (27.8 km^{2})
  - Land: 1.7 sq mi (4.5 km^{2})
  - Water: 9.0 sq mi (23.3 km^{2})
- Elevation: 0 ft (0 m)

Population (2000)
  - Total: 1,561
  - Density: 901/sq mi (347.8/km^{2})
- Time zone: UTC-8 (Pacific (PST))
  - Summer (DST): UTC-7 (PDT)
- FIPS code: 53-72705
- GNIS feature ID: 1867639

Tulalip Bay (Tulalip Lushootseed: dxʷlilap) is a former census-designated place (CDP) in western Snohomish County, Washington, United States. The population was 1,561 at the 2000 census. The CDP was discontinued at the 2010 census. It is the largest community within the reservation of the federally recognized Tulalip Tribes of Washington.

== Geography ==
Tulalip Bay is located at 48°3′56″N 122°17′13″W (48.065629, -122.286872).

According to the United States Census Bureau, the CDP has a total area of 10.7 square miles (27.8 km^{2}), of which, 1.7 square miles (4.5 km^{2}) of it is land and 9.0 square miles (23.3 km^{2}) of it (83.86%) is water. Tulalip is believed to be the location of the first known sighting of the Black bear in Washington state.

== Demographics ==
As of the census of 2000, there were 1,561 people, 595 households, and 377 families residing in the CDP. The population density was 900.7 people per square mile (348.4/km^{2}). There were 703 housing units at an average density of 405.7/sq mi (156.9/km^{2}). The racial makeup of the CDP was 55.41% White, 0.19% African American, 37.60% Native American, 1.15% Asian, 0.38% Pacific Islander, 0.32% from other races, and 4.93% from two or more races. Hispanic or Latino of any race were 2.63% of the population.

There were 595 households, out of which 28.2% had children under the age of 18 living with them, 43.9% were married couples living together, 13.6% had a female householder with no husband present, and 36.5% were non-families. 25.9% of all households were made up of individuals, and 7.6% had someone living alone who was 65 years of age or older. The average household size was 2.61 and the average family size was 3.15.

In the CDP, the age distribution of the population shows 27.6% under the age of 18, 6.9% from 18 to 24, 25.6% from 25 to 44, 28.3% from 45 to 64, and 11.6% who were 65 years of age or older. The median age was 38 years. For every 100 females, there were 107.0 males. For every 100 females age 18 and over, there were 100.7 males.

The median income for a household in the CDP was $43,594, and the median income for a family was $49,000. Males had a median income of $35,057 versus $30,735 for females. The per capita income for the CDP was $20,092. About 12.1% of families and 16.8% of the population were below the poverty line, including 22.6% of those under age 18 and 12.4% of those age 65 or over.
