= Tulalip Tribes =

Coordinates: 48°04′40″N 122°16′15″W

Tulalip Tribes of Washington
dxʷlilap
- Logo of the Tulalip Tribes

Total population
- 2,500–2,800 enrolled members

Regions with significant populations
- United States (Washington)

Languages
- English, Lushootseed

Religion
- Traditional tribal religion

Related ethnic groups
- other Duwamish, Snohomish, Snoqualmie, Skagit, Sauk-Suiattle, Samish, and Stillaguamish people

Location of the Tulalip Indian Reservation

The Tulalip Tribes of Washington (/tʊˈleɪlɪp/, Lushootseed: dxʷlilap (Note: Pronounced doh-LAY-luhp)), formerly known as the Tulalip Tribes of the Tulalip Reservation, is a federally recognized tribe of Duwamish, Snohomish, Snoqualmie, Skagit, Suiattle, Samish, and Stillaguamish people. They are South and Central Coast Salish peoples of Indigenous peoples of the Pacific Northwest Coast. Their tribes are located in the mid-Puget Sound region of Washington.

The Tulalip Indian Reservation, established by the Treaty of Point Elliott in 1855, is located west of Marysville, Washington, in the Seattle metropolitan area. It comprises 34.7 square miles (90 km^{2}) and includes Quil Ceda Village, a special municipality and economic development for the tribe.

== Name ==
The term Tulalip (originally Lushootseed: dxʷlilap) comes from the Snohomish dialect. It was used in 1855 to describe the tribes who joined on the Tulalip Reservation established by treaty with the federal government. They included the Duwamish, Snohomish, Snoqualmie, Skagit, Suiattle, Samish, and Stillaguamish peoples, all of whom are South and Central Coast Salish peoples.

== Reservation ==
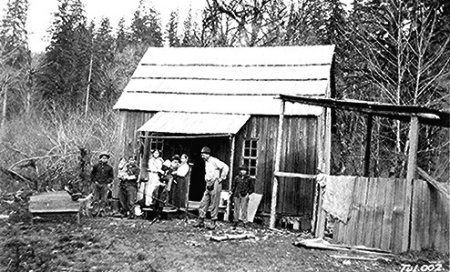
A Tulalip family in front of their home on the reservation in 1916. Gabe Gobin worked as a logger.

Historical population
Census	Pop.	Note	%±
1950	1,249		—
1980	5,046		—
1990	7,103		40.8%
2000	9,246		30.2%
2010	10,631		15.0%
2020	10,969		3.2%
Tulalip Tribes; U.S. Census Bureau

The Tulalip Indian Reservation was established by the Treaty of Point Elliot in 1855 and by Executive Order of US President Ulysses S. Grant on January 22, 1873. The reservation lies on Port Susan in western Snohomish County, adjacent to the western border of the city of Marysville. It has a land area of 34.7 square miles (90 km^{2}; 22,200 acres) and a 2020 census population of 10,969 persons residing within its boundaries. The reservation's largest community is Tulalip Bay.

The Tulalip people settled onto reservation lands after signing the Point Elliott Treaty with the former Washington Territory on January 22, 1855. The reservation was intended to serve most of the tribes in the Puget Sound region, but plans were scaled back after additional reservations were added. The Tulalip Indian Reservation now comprises the western half of the Marysville–Tulalip community, which was divided by the construction of Interstate 5 in the 1950s and 1960s. Marysville is an incorporated city and lies east of the freeway. A 2,000-acre (810 ha) section of the reservation was home to a federal ammunition depot established during World War II and later used by Boeing for chemical weapons testing and storage.

The Marysville School District serves both the city and the reservation. To accommodate a growing population, in 2008 it opened three new schools, built of prefabricated, modular units that operate and look like traditional construction, at its site on the reservation. This large campus is now called the Marysville Secondary Campus; it contains Tulalip Heritage High School, Legacy High School, and a middle school. The two high schools share a gym and commons center. In 2022, the Tulalip Tribes announced plans to build their own elementary school that would use an alternative, Indigenous-focused education model that had been trialed at Heritage High School.

=== Communities ===
- Cathan
- John Sam Lake
- Priest Point
- Quil Ceda Village
- Shaker Church
- Stimson Crossing
- Tulalip Bay
- Weallup Lake

== Economy ==
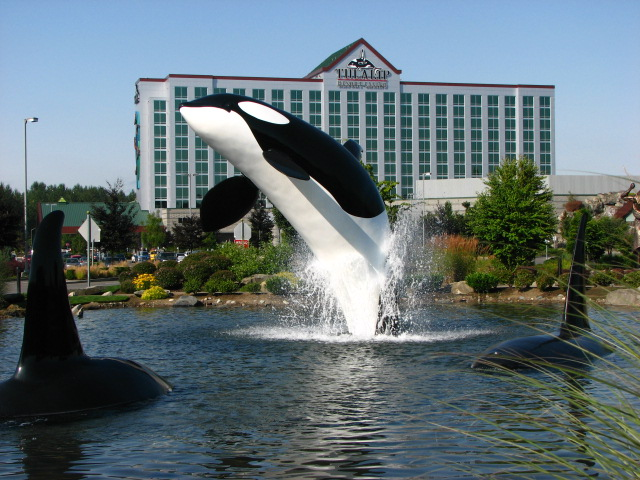
Tulalip Resort Casino, part of Quil Ceda Village

The Tulalip Tribes own and operate Tulalip Bingo, Quil Ceda Deli, Canoes Carvery, Cedars Cafe, Tulalip Bay Restaurant, Journeys East, The Draft Sports Bar & Grill, Tulalip Resort Casino, Quil Ceda Creek Nightclub and Casino, Torch Grill, and Q Burgers, all located in Tulalip, Washington. With revenues generated by their successful casinos, they have invested and developed other businesses to diversify their economy.

The tribe sought development of a major shopping and business center along Interstate 5 in the 1990s and aimed to attract the auxiliary support facility of Naval Station Everett as its main tenant, but an agreement broke down. The tribe's original casino was renamed to Quil Ceda Creek Casino and was replaced by a new, 126,700-square-foot (11,770 m^{2}) building in 2021.

=== Quil Ceda Village ===
The tribe has developed Quil Ceda Village as a 800-acre (320 ha) municipality within the reservation. It also developed a business park to provide jobs and tax income for the tribe, and to diversify its economy. Situated alongside Interstate 5, the business park includes the tribe's first gaming casino, Quil Ceda Creek Casino; the second, the $72 million Tulalip Resort Casino, and a $130 million associated 12-story hotel.

Retail businesses include Walmart and Home Depot. In 2004, the tribe signed a deal with Chelsea Property Group to develop an outlet mall on the reservation. The company agreed to develop 100 to 120 stores on 47 acres of land near the tribe's casino and the Quil Ceda Business Park. The contract is expected to yield $1.2 million annually in revenues for the tribe. The deal runs for 75 years. The outlet mall, Seattle Premium Outlets, opened in 2005; a variety of restaurants also opened. The tribe also operates two gas stations that opened in 2009 and 2011 with discounts for tribal members. The gas stations were originally supplied by Chevron, but switched to a Yakama Nation-owned distributor in 2022.

The Tulalip Tribes owns a disused railroad bridge over Interstate 5 at the north end of Quil Ceda Village that had been used by Boeing for access to its engine test site on the reservation. The tribe has long-term plans to use the bridge for a multi-use pedestrian and bicycling trail that would connect to a proposed Amtrak Cascades station in Marysville.

== Government ==
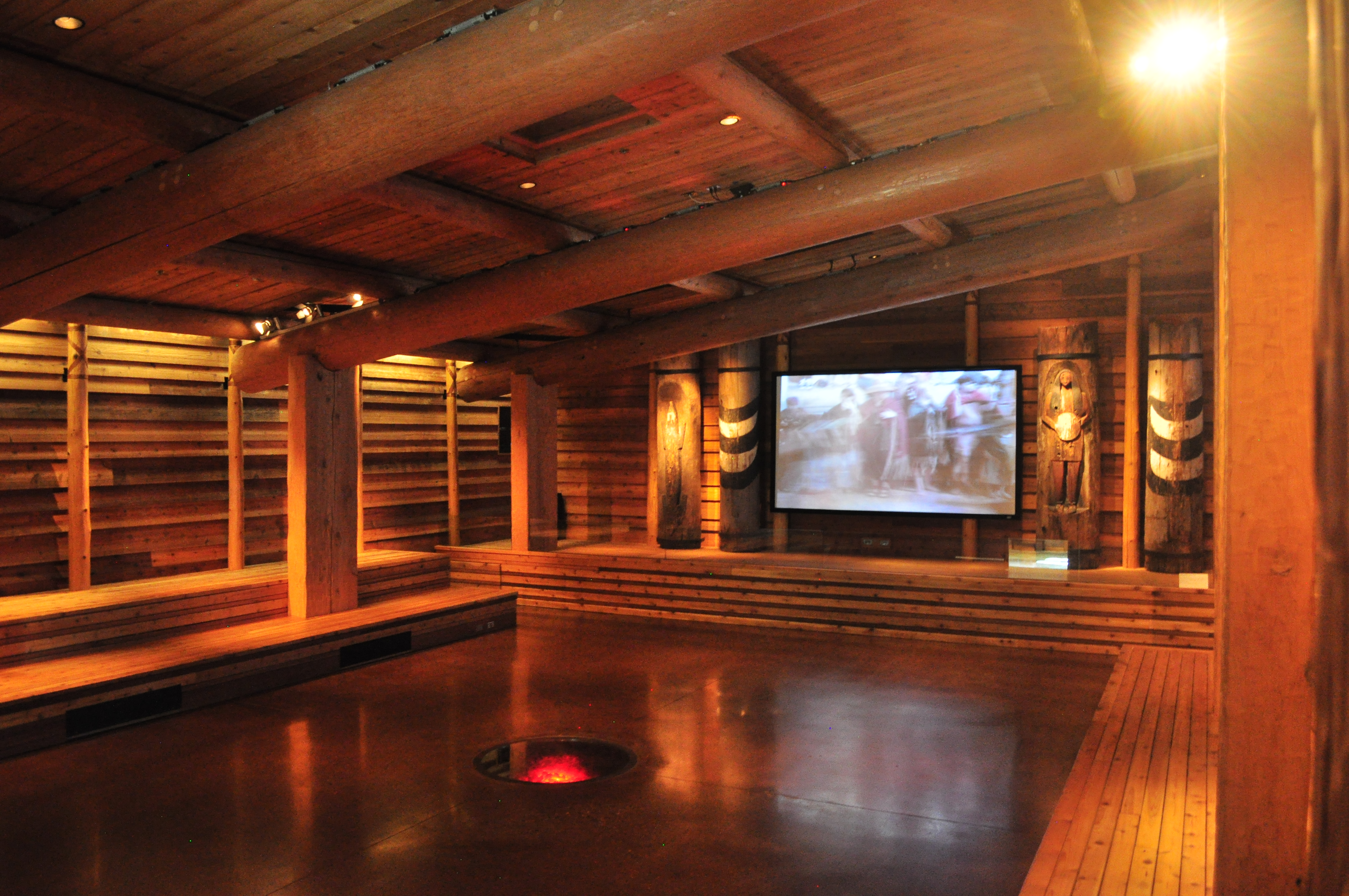
Replica of a traditional longhouse interior at the Hibulb Cultural Center.

The Tulalip Tribes are headquartered in Tulalip, Washington. The tribe is governed by a seven-member, democratically elected Board of Directors, whose members fill designated roles as officers. Directors are elected to serve three year terms. The current tribal administration is as follows:

- Chairwoman: Teri Gobin
- Vice Chairwoman: Misty Napeahi
- Secretary: Theresa Sheldon
- Treasurer: Hazen Shopbell
- Council member: Glen Gobin
- Council member: Marlin Fryberg Jr.
- Council member: Debra Posey

The Tulalip Tribes has defined its rules for membership in the tribe. Membership is based on January 1, 1935, Tulalip census roll; new applicants must prove descent from persons on that roll and that their parents were residents of the Tulalip Reservation for at least 12 continuous months at any time before the individual's birth. In addition, applicants must submit their enrollment application before reaching 25 years of age, unless they were adopted by non-tribal parents. It does not require a minimum blood quantum.

=== VAWA 2013 pilot project ===
The US Supreme Court's majority opinion in Oliphant v. Suquamish Indian Tribe (1978) affirmed that tribal courts were not allowed to have jurisdiction over a non-Indian person in a criminal case on the reservation. Through the passage of the Violence Against Women Reauthorization Act of 2013 (VAWA 2013), signed into law on March 7, 2013, by President Barack Obama, tribal courts have been authorized to exercise special criminal jurisdiction over certain crimes of domestic and dating violence.

This new law generally took effect on March 7, 2015. It also authorized a voluntary "Pilot Project" to allow certain tribes to begin exercising special jurisdiction beginning February 20, 2014. Three tribes were selected for this Pilot Project: the Confederated Tribes of the Umatilla Indian Reservation (Oregon), the Pascua Yaqui Tribe (Arizona), and the Tulalip Tribes of Washington.

=== Politics ===
The Tulalip Tribes has begun to act more in local and state politics, at times in alliance with other Native American tribes in the state. In November 2002, John McCoy, a longtime Tulalip leader, was elected to the Washington state legislature, where he first served as the only Native American member. McCoy remained a member of the state legislature until his retirement in 2020. For a time he served as the only Native American in the legislature, at other times being joined by Jeff Morris, an Alaskan Native (Tsimpshian) who was elected in 1996 with two other Alaskan Natives, Dino Rossi (Tlingit) and Jim Dunn (Aleut). Seven other Native Americans have since been elected to the state legislature, including Julie Johnson (Lummi). Only one Native American state representative is Republican; all the others are members of the Democratic Party.

In addition, in the 2002 election, the Tulalip worked with other tribes in the state to defeat a candidate for the state Supreme Court who had "a long track record of opposing tribal interests."

== Culture ==
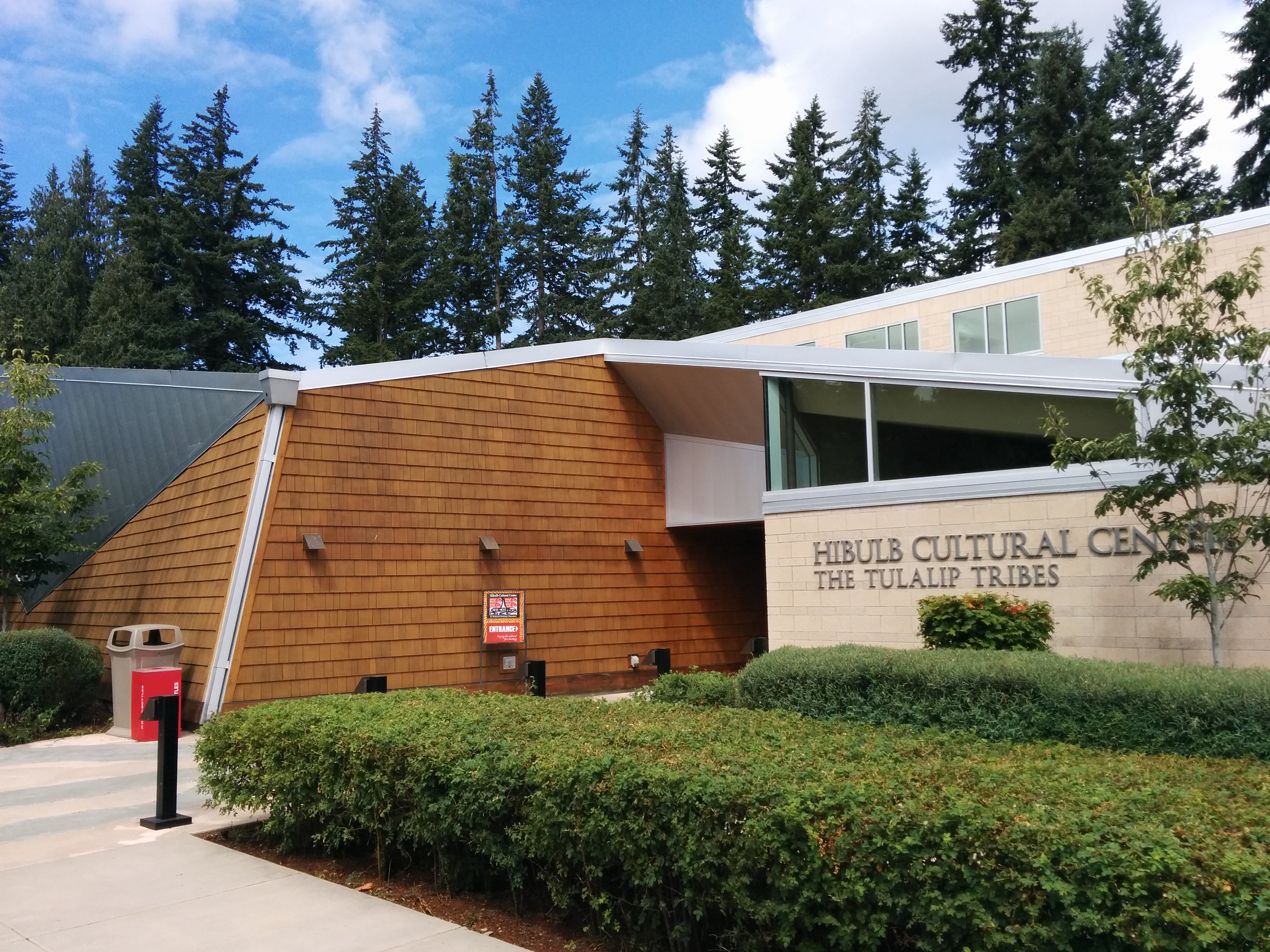
Hibulb Cultural Center and Museum

=== Museum ===
In August 2011, the tribe opened the 23,000 square feet (2,100 m^{2}) Hibulb Cultural Center and Natural History Preserve on the reservation. The center includes museum exhibits of Tulalip history and artifacts, classrooms, an archaeological repository, a longhouse, and a research library. The museum also includes a 50 acres (20 ha) nature preserve.

=== Language ===
The tribes speak English and Lushootseed, a Central Salish language. The language is written in the Latin script. A dictionary and grammar have been published. The tribe established its own language department in the 1990s to promote and preserve the use of Lushootseed across the region. Marysville Pilchuck High School began offering Lushootseed classes to its students in 2019.

=== Events ===
The tribes host numerous annual events, including Treaty Days, typically in January to commemorate the signing of the Point Elliot Treaty on January 22, 1855; First King Salmon Ceremony, to bless the fishermen and celebrate catching the first king salmon of the season; Winter Dancing; and a Veteran's Pow Wow during the first weekend of every June.
