= High priest (disambiguation) =

A high priest is a term often used to describe the leading figure in various religious organizations, particularly in antiquity.

High Priest may also refer to:

- High Priest (album), by Alex Chilton
- High Priest (book), by Timothy Leary
- The High Priests of War (book) by Michael Collins Piper

== See also ==
- High priestess (disambiguation)
