= Shane Pahukoa =

American football player (born 1970)

No. 35
- Position: Safety

Personal information
- Born: November 25, 1970 (age 55); Vancouver, Washington, U.S.
- Listed height: 6 ft 3 in (1.91 m)
- Listed weight: 210 lb (95 kg)

Career information
- High school: Marysville (WA) Pilchuck
- College: Washington
- NFL draft: 1993: undrafted

Career history
- New Orleans Saints (1993–1995)

Awards and highlights
- National champion (1991); 2× Second-team All-Pac-10 (1991, 1992)

Career NFL statistics
- Games played: 15
- Tackles: 35
- Interceptions: 2
- Stats at Pro Football Reference

Shane Pahukoa (born November 25, 1970) is an American former professional football player who was a safety for two seasons with the New Orleans Saints of the National Football League (NFL). He played college football for the Washington Huskies and was not drafted.

== College career ==
Pahukoa was a four-year letterman for the University of Washington from 1989 to 1992 and served as team captain. He won three Pac-10 Championships and one National Championship during his time at Washington. In 1990, Pahukoa was named to the First Team All-Pac-10 Academic Team. He was also selected as a Second Team All-Pac-10 free safety in both 1991 and 1992.

His brother, Jeff, also played at Washington as an offensive lineman.

== Professional career ==
Pahukoa led the New Orleans Saints in special teams tackles in 1995 with 20 tackles. Against the New England Patriots, he racked up 12 tackles and intercepted Drew Bledsoe twice.
