= Jeff Pahukoa =

American football player (born 1969)

No. 69, 64
- Position: Offensive lineman

Personal information
- Born: February 9, 1969 (age 57); Vancouver, Washington, U.S.
- Listed height: 6 ft 2 in (1.88 m)
- Listed weight: 268 lb (122 kg)

Career information
- High school: Marysville (WA) Pilchuck
- College: Washington
- NFL draft: 1991: 12th round, 311th overall pick

Career history
- Los Angeles Rams (1991–1993); Atlanta Falcons (1995–1996)

Awards and highlights
- Third-team All-American (1990); First-team All-Pac-10 (1990)

Career NFL statistics
- Games played: 59
- Games started: 10
- Stats at Pro Football Reference

Jeff Kalani Pahukoa (born February 9, 1969) is an American former professional football player who was an offensive lineman in the National Football League (NFL). He played college football for the Washington Huskies and was selected by the Los Angeles Rams in the 12th round of the 1991 NFL draft with the 311th overall pick. He played five seasons for the Rams from 1991 to 1993 and Atlanta Falcons from 1995 to 1996.

His brother, Shane, also played at Washington as a safety.
