= Marysville School District =

US School District

Marysville School District 25

Location
- 4220 80th Street NE Marysville, WA 98270; United States

District information
- Type: Public
- Motto: Engage, Inspire, Prepare
- Grades: PreK-12
- Superintendent: Deborah Rumbaugh
- Budget: $199,484,992 (General fund 2025-26)

Students and staff
- Students: approximately 9,100
- Teachers: 756
- Staff: 639
- Athletic conference: Wesco North Athletic Conference

Other information
- Website: Official website

Marysville School District No. 25 is a public school district in Marysville, Washington, United States. It serves the city of Marysville and members of the nearby Tulalip Tribes. In May 2013, the district had an enrollment of 11,426 students. In 2019, it had an 84% 4-year graduation rate, an increase of 7% from the previous year. In 2022–2023, the district had 756 classroom teachers.

The district includes the majority of Marysville, and portions of the Lake Cassidy, Lake Goodwin, Lochsloy, and Sisco Heights census-designated places.

Marysville School District operates one elementary school, Quil Ceda Tulalip Elementary, on the Tulalip Reservation. The Tulalip Tribes collaborate with Marysville School District in providing an on-reservation high school, Heritage High School.

== Schools ==
=== Elementary schools ===
- Allen Creek Elementary School
- Cascade Elementary School
- Grove Elementary School
- Kellogg Marsh Elementary School
- Liberty Elementary School
  - Marysville Cooperative Education Program
- Marshall Elementary
- Pinewood Elementary School
- Quil Ceda Tulalip Elementary School
- Shoultes Elementary School
- Sunnyside Elementary

=== Middle schools ===
- Cedarcrest Middle School
- 10th Street Middle School (Marysville Tulalip Campus)
- Totem Middle School

=== High schools ===
- Legacy High School
- Marysville Getchell High School
- Marysville Pilchuck High School
- Tulalip Heritage High School

=== Marysville Tulalip Campus ===
Formerly Marysville Secondary Campus, it is an 84,000-square-foot campus which houses three separate schools operated by the Marysville School District and the Tulalip Tribes. The structures were constructed in 2008 of newly built prefab modular units which look and feel like traditional construction. The high schools share a gym and commons center. The site is owned by the district within the Tulalip Reservation.

== Governance ==
The district is governed by a board of directors elected from geographical sub-districts. Each of the five directors is elected for a term of two years. The superintendent is Becky Berg. In October 2017, Deborah Parker was selected to serve as its director of Equity, Diversity, and Indian Education and continues to do so as of June 2018.

A pair of levies were rejected by voters in 2022, leading to a financial crisis at the school district that required oversight from the Washington State Office of Superintendent of Public Instruction. The state office placed the Marysville School District under "binding conditions" in August 2023, making it the largest school district in Washington to require special oversight. In June 2024, Washington Superintendent of Public Instruction Chris Reykdal declared Marysville school district financially insolvent, declaring the convention of a Financial Oversight Committee.

== Marysville School District Initiatives ==
The district offered computer science education for all elementary students through elementary computer science specialists. As part of a focus on technology, Marysville deployed Chromebooks to all students in grades 6–12, coupled with professional development for teachers in those grades on changing pedagogy.

== 2014 school shooting ==
On October 24, 2014, at 10:39 a.m. PST, Marysville Pilchuck High School, located in Marysville, Washington outside Seattle, became the location of a school shooting. A gunman, identified as freshman student Jaylen Fryberg, shot several students before killing himself at the school. Four students, one of whom was a cousin of Fryberg's, were killed and a fifth, another of Fryberg's cousins, was seriously injured.
