= High priestess (disambiguation) =

A high priestess is a female high priest.

High Priestess may also refer to:

- High Priestess (album), an album by Kobra and the Lotus
- High Priestess (TV series), an Indian TV series
- The High Priestess, Tarot card

== See also ==
- High priest (disambiguation)
