= Quil Ceda Village =

Quil Ceda Village qʷəl'sidəʔ ʔalʔaltəd
- Consolidated borough
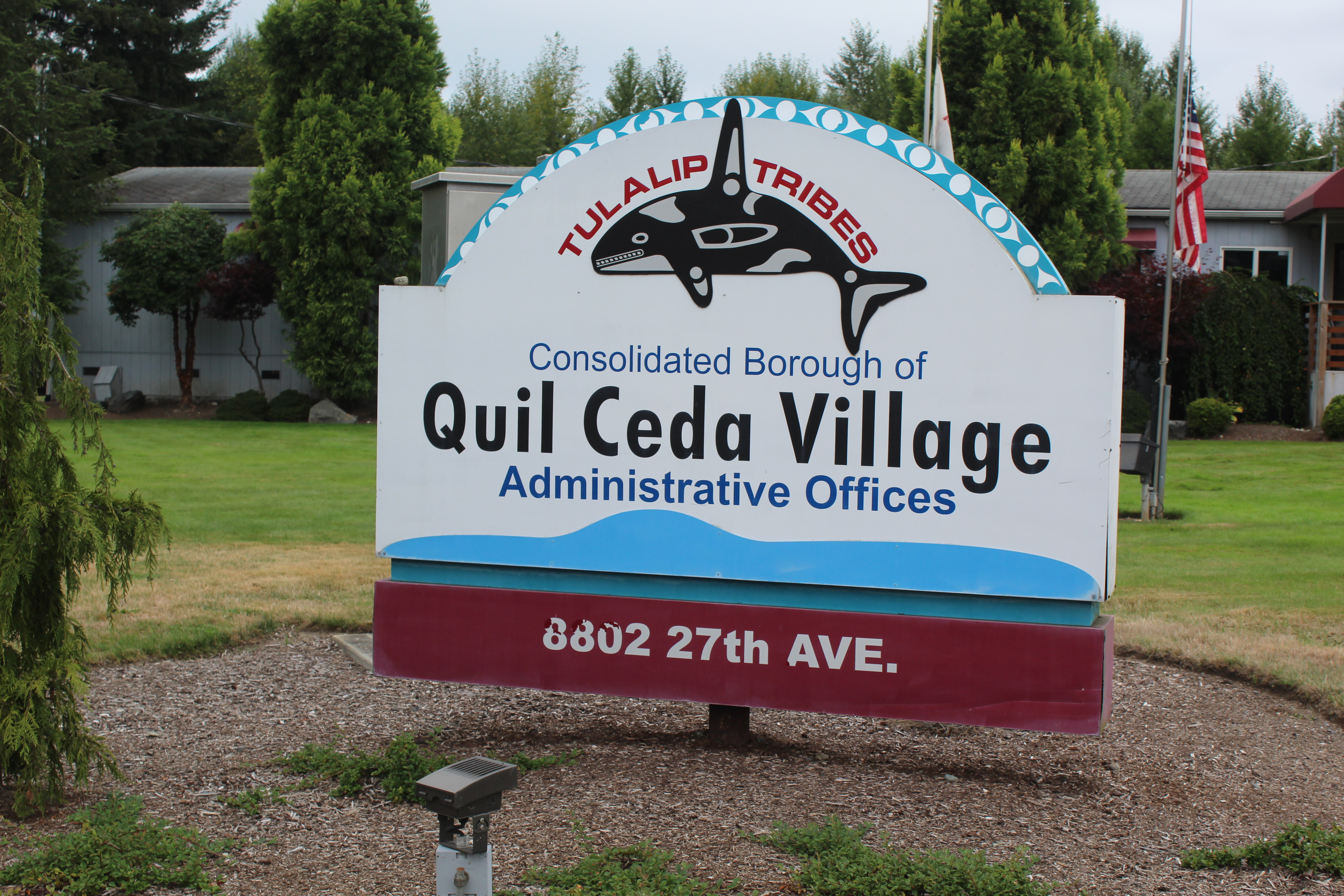
- Sign at the Administrative Offices of Quil Ceda Village
- Interactive map of Quil Ceda Village
- Coordinates: 48°05′08″N 122°12′23″W
- Country: United States
- State: Washington
- County: Snohomish
- Incorporated: 2001
- Founder: Tulalip Tribes

Government
  - Type: Council-manager
  - Council president: Mel Sheldon, Jr.
  - Manager: Martin Napeahi

Area
  - Total: 3.28 sq mi (8.5 km^{2})
  - Land: 3.28 sq mi (8.5 km^{2})
  - Water: 0.00 sq mi (0 km^{2})
- Elevation: 69 ft (21 m)
- Time zone: UTC-8 (PST)
  - Summer (DST): UTC-7 (PDT)
- ZIP Code: 98271
- Area code: 360, 564
- FIPS code: 53-TS150
- GNIS feature ID: 2612178
- Website: quilcedavillage.org

Quil Ceda Village (Lushootseed: qʷəl'sidəʔ ʔalʔaltəd) is a municipality established by the federally recognized Tulalip Tribes of Washington within the Tulalip Indian Reservation in Snohomish County, Washington, United States. It includes the Quil Ceda Village Business Park, a commercial development constructed and operated by the tribe.

The tribe developed the 495-acre (200.32 hectare) village and related business park to further its goal to diversify its economy with funds generated by its successful casino operations, the first enterprise in the business park. The Business Park contains the Tulalip Resort Casino, big box stores Walmart and The Home Depot, Seattle Premium Outlets (a 125-tenant open-air mall opened in 2005), Cabela's, and several restaurants.

The land was originally home to a testing site that was leased by the United States Department of Defense for ammunition storage in the 1940s and 1950s and later Boeing for jet engine testing until 2000. The retail section began with Walmart and The Home Depot stores in 2001.

== History and status ==
In 2001, the Bureau of Indian Affairs approved the Village's status as a tribal municipality, and the IRS "designated the village as a political subdivision of the federally recognized tribe" under provisions of the Indian Tribal Governmental Tax Status Act of 1982. It provides essential government functions. Quil Ceda Village is the first tribal political subdivision in the nation established under this Act, and the only federal municipality besides Washington, D.C. The village is chartered by the tribe as a consolidated borough with a council–manager government.

The first independent retail businesses at the Business Park were Walmart and The Home Depot. Walmart opened its 150,000-square-foot store, its second in the county and 27th in the state, on April 18, 2001; The Home Depot followed suit with the opening of its 115,000-square-foot store just north of Walmart on August 16, 2001.

In 2002, the Tulalip Tribes sought legislation that would give its government a share of the sales taxes generated at the business park, as the tribe provides services at the business park similar to those provided by other municipalities. This was unprecedented for a Native American tribe in the U.S.; the state legislature had proposed incorporating the area as a municipality to instead collect sales taxes under normal procedures. The "tribe has spent millions of dollars to build and pay for Quil Ceda's infrastructure and to provide such government services as police and fire protection there." According to a public policy think tank, in 2001 about $50 million in sales taxes was collected at the Quil Ceda stores; most of this money went to the state. Legislators were reluctant to establish a precedent for rebates to the tribe, especially at a time of severe budget issues. "Under the proposal, the state would still receive its full 6.5 percent share of sales." The Tulalip Tribes filed a lawsuit against the state and county governments in 2016 for collection of sales tax at non-tribal stores; it was settled in 2020 after several appeals and mediation to grant a portion of the state's collected tax revenue to the Tulalip Tribes.

With the Tulalip Casino outgrowing its first location, it moved into a 227,000-square-foot (21,100 m^{2}) building on the property that opened on June 5, 2003; the previous location was reverted to a bingo hall.

On February 4, 2004, the Tulalip Tribes reached an agreement with Chelsea Property Group, a developer of outlet malls based in Roseland, New Jersey, to build an outlet mall known as Seattle Premium Outlets. Chelsea, whose subsequent acquisition by Simon Property Group was announced on June 21, agreed to lease the mall's site from the tribe in addition to constructing and managing the mall. The mall opened on May 5, 2005, with 383,000 square feet of retail space; a promenade expansion to the mall was opened on June 20, 2013, adding more than 100,000 square feet of space.

On June 6, 2011, the Tulalip Tribes announced that Cabela's would build a 110,000-square-foot store, its second in the state, between The Home Depot and the resort casino; the land had remained empty since the opening of the business park due to the tribe seeking an ideal business for the property. A ground-breaking ceremony for the store occurred in August 2011; it subsequently opened on April 19, 2012.

A seasonal fireworks market, named Boom City, operates out of a lot behind the Tulalip Resort Casino before Independence Day.
