= Marysville Pilchuck High School =

Coordinates: 48°05′47″N 122°09′16″W

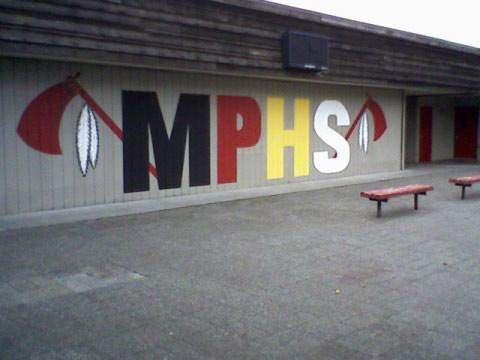
- Mural at Marysville Pilchuck High School, October 2009

Location
- 5611 108th St NE; Marysville, Washington 98271; United States

Information
- Type: Public Secondary School
- Motto: Give respect, take responsibility, get results.
- Established: September 8, 1970
- School district: Marysville School District
- Principal: Peter Apple
- Teaching staff: 61.42 (FTE)
- Grades: 9–12
- Enrollment: 1,182 (2024-2025)
- Student to teacher ratio: 19.24
- Campus size: 87 acres
- Campus type: Suburban, co-educational
- Colors: Red, White & Gold
- Athletics conference: 2A Northwest
- Mascot: Tomahawks
- Newspaper: The Source
- Yearbook: Quil Ceda Summit
- Website: www.msd25.org/o/marysville-pilchuck-high-school

Marysville Pilchuck High School, located in Marysville, Washington, is a public secondary school serving grades 9–12. It is part of the Marysville School District.

== History ==
MPHS is a combination of two local schools. The first high school in Marysville was called Marysville High School. To relieve overcrowding there, Pilchuck High School opened on September 8, 1970, although it was still under construction when it opened. Later the two student populations were combined and additions made to create one large high school called Marysville-Pilchuck High School. In 2007 the student population peaked at over 2,500. The original high school building was adapted for use as the city's junior high school and now operates as Totem Middle School.

As of 2018, the school served 1,274 students in grades 9-12.

Four academies previously at the high school: Academy of Construction and Engineering, Bio-Med Academy, International School of Communications, and School for the Entrepreneur, were relocated to the newly constructed Marysville Getchell High School, which opened in 2010.

School days are organized into six periods.

=== 2014 school shooting ===
On 24 October 2014, the high school was the location of a school shooting. Four students were killed and a fifth was seriously injured. The gunman, a student at the school, died from a self-inflicted gunshot wound.

== Programs ==
Since September 2010, the school has a central program called Pathways of Choice. MPHS still offers specialized classes, some of which have been cancelled at other schools, such as auto shop. MPHS also offers:

- Four band programs.
- Multiple art programs (Ceramics, Oil Painting, Sculpture, and Intermediate).
- Music Programs (drama and pit orchestra, choir, guitar).
- Language courses, including Lushootseed, French, Japanese, and Spanish (with Japanese offering college credit).
- Many AP Classes and other college-prep programs (AP-level classes include Art, Chemistry, Biology, Calculus AB, Statistics, Composition and Language, Literacy and Language, and U.S. History)
- Sports Medicine (after-school program)
- An NJROTC program that provides many classes and activities such as air rifle, cyber patriots, and drill. It's shared with Getchell and Legacy High Schools and has expanded into accepting students from the surrounding Middle Schools.

The school offers "College in the High School" programs, which enable students to earn college credits by completing college-level classes taken at the high school. Such classes include Pre-Calculus, College Algebra, Chemistry, Physics, Japanese III, Child Development, Advanced Child Development, MOS I, II; Horticulture II, Advanced Marketing, and almost every AP class. NJROTC, Culinary Arts, Running Start, and Sno-Isle Skills Center are also offered.

== Arts programs ==
The drama club won an award for "Outstanding Orchestra" by Seattle's Fifth Avenue Theatre for its production of Stephen Sondheim's Into The Woods as the 2008 spring musical, conducted by Brian Kesler. The actors playing The Princes were also nominated for "Outstanding Performance by an Ensemble Group" for the same production. The drama club was also nominated for "Outstanding Performance by an Ensemble Group" by Seattle's Fifth Avenue Theatre for the urchins in their production of "Little Shop of Horrors" in 2014 and received an Honorable Mention for "Outstanding Performance by an Actress in a Featured Ensemble Role" in 2015 for an actress in their production of Disney's "Mary Poppins."

In the 2012 Jazz Unlimited festival at Columbia Basin College, MP won 1st in its division and a gold medal for Wind Ensemble out of 33 bands, 2nd for its Jazz I, the Don Paul "Excellence" award for best overall band in its division, best trombone section, best tuba section, outstanding soloist awards for Calvin White on alto sax and Brandon Pangalinan on tenor sax, and a bronze medal for its Symphonic band. During 2012 MPMEA Solo and Ensemble seven students received superior ratings. The Sax Quartet was declared 1st runner up for state and the Flute Trio received 2nd runner up for state.

Art students at MP entered 30 pieces of work into the Scholastic Art and Writing Awards contest. They received 28 prizes.

== Athletics ==
The high school's main stadium hosted exhibition matches for the Seattle Sounders of the second-division A-League in 1998 and 1998. They lost 4–1 to the Colorado Rapids of Major League Soccer in the second 1998 match, which was relocated to Marysville due to its grass surface.

== Notable alumni ==
- Larry Christenson – former MLB pitcher (Philadelphia Phillies)
- Haley Nemra – 2008 Beijing Olympic runner representing The Marshall Islands
- Jarred Rome – Olympic discus thrower
- Dave Stachelski – former NFL football player (New England Patriots – New Orleans Saints)
- Jeff Pahukoa – Former NFL football player (St. Louis Rams – Atlanta Falcons)
- Shane Pahukoa – former NFL football player (New Orleans Saints)
- Jake Luton - NFL football player (Jacksonville Jaguars)
- Brady Ballew – Professional Soccer Player (Tulsa Roughnecks)
- Anne Quast - amateur golfer
