= List of newspapers in Washington (state) =

The former offices of the Seattle Post-Intelligencer, printed from 1863 to 2009

The U.S. state of Washington in the Pacific Northwest region has dozens of newspapers that range from large daily publications in major cities to weeklies in small cities and rural areas, alternative newspapers in urban areas, and student newspapers at universities and colleges. Most of these newspapers are in English, but some areas have outlets that are published in Spanish, Chinese, Japanese, Korean, and Vietnamese among others. The state's federally recognized tribes and other Native American communities also publish their own newspapers that are distributed locally or to a wider population of members.

As of 2022, there are 20 operating daily newspapers in the state. The largest is The Seattle Times, which had a print circulation of 58,900 in 2025 and ranked ninth in the United States. The city's other daily newspaper, the Seattle Post-Intelligencer, was printed from 1863 until it became an online-only publication in 2009. Other major daily newspapers in the state include The Spokesman-Review in Spokane; The News Tribune in Tacoma; The Columbian in Vancouver; and The Everett Herald in Everett. Most community and rural newspapers in the state print on a weekly basis.

== Daily newspapers ==
Daily newspapers in Washington (state)
| Newspaper | City | County | Founded | Circulation (2021) | Owner | Ref. |
|---|---|---|---|---|---|---|
| The Bellingham Herald | Bellingham | Whatcom | 1890 | 13,073 | McClatchy | |
| The Columbian | Vancouver | Clark | 1890 | 48,078 | Columbian Publishing Company | |
| Columbia Basin Herald | Moses Lake | Grant | 1941 | 7,780 | Hagadone Corporation | |
| The Daily Record | Ellensburg | Kittitas | 1883 | 5,523 | Adams Publishing Group | |
| The Daily News | Longview | Cowlitz | 1923 | 18,536 | Lee Enterprises | |
| The Daily World | Aberdeen | Grays Harbor | 1889 | 6,281 | Sound Publishing | |
| The Everett Herald | Everett | Snohomish | 1901 | 33,543 | Sound Publishing | |
| Kitsap Sun | Bremerton | Kitsap | 1935 | 16,683 | Gannett | |
| The News Tribune | Tacoma | Pierce | 1883 | 54,000 | McClatchy | |
| The Olympian | Olympia | Thurston | 1860 | 17,401 | McClatchy | |
| Peninsula Daily News | Port Angeles | Clallam | 1916 | 11,724 | Sound Publishing | |
| The Seattle Times | Seattle | King | 1891 | 210,156 | The Seattle Times Company | |
| Skagit Valley Herald | Mount Vernon | Skagit | 1884 | 13,492 | Adams Publishing Group | |
| The Spokesman-Review | Spokane | Spokane | 1883 | 56,629 | Cowles Company | |
| Tri-City Herald | Kennewick | Benton | 1918 | 25,663 | McClatchy | |
| Walla Walla Union-Bulletin | Walla Walla | Walla Walla | 1869 | 11,731 | The Seattle Times Company | |
| The Wenatchee World | Wenatchee | Chelan | 1905 | 15,001 | Wick Communications | |
| Yakima Herald-Republic | Yakima | Yakima | 1903 | 24,827 | The Seattle Times Company | |

== Weekly, semi-weekly and monthly newspapers ==
- Anacortes American – Anacortes
- Auburn Reporter – Auburn
- Bainbridge Island Review – Bainbridge Island
- The Reflector – Battle Ground
- Cascadia Daily News – Bellingham
- The Northern Light – Blaine
- Quad-City Herald – Brewster
- Cashmere Valley Record – Cashmere
- Wahkiakum County Eagle – Cathlamet
- Camas-Washougal Post-Record – Camas
- The Chronicle – Centralia
- Lake Chelan Mirror – Chelan
- Cheney Free Press – Cheney
- Chewelah Independent – Chewelah
- Chinook Observer – Chinook
- Northern Kittitas County Tribune – Cle Elum
- Whitman County Gazette – Colfax
- Statesman-Examiner – Colville
- The Concrete Herald – Concrete
- Deer Park Tribune – Deer Park
- Islands' Sounder – Eastsound
- Eatonville Dispatch – Eatonville
- Edmonds Beacon – Edmonds
- Enumclaw Courier-Herald – Enumclaw
- Grand County Journal – Ephrata
- Federal Way Mirror – Federal Way
- Ferndale Record – Ferndale
- Journal of the San Juan Islands – Friday Harbor
- Forks Forum – Forks
- Peninsula Gateway – Gig Harbor
- Grandview Herald – Grandview
- Goldendale Sentinel – Goldendale
- Issaquah-Sammamish Reporter – Issaquah, Sammamish
- Kent Reporter – Kent
- Leavenworth Echo – Leavenworth
- Lynden Tribune – Lynden
- Lynnwood Times – Lynnwood
- Mercer Island Reporter – Mercer Island
- Mill Creek View – Mill Creek
- Mill Creek Beacon – Mill Creek
- Mukilteo Beacon – Mukilteo
- East County Journal – Morton
- Newport Miner – Newport
- Snoqualmie Valley Record – North Bend
- South Whidbey Record – Oak Harbor
- Sunnyside Sun – Sunnyside
- Whidbey News-Times – Oak Harbor
- The Omak-Okanogan County Chronicle – Omak
- East Washingtonian – Pomeroy
- Port Orchard Independent – Port Orchard
- Port Townsend Leader – Port Townsend
- Prosser Record-Bulletin – Prosser
- North Kitsap Herald – Poulsbo
- Puyallup Herald – Puyallup
- Quincy Valley Post-Register – Quincy
- Willapa Harbor Herald – Raymond
- Redmond Reporter – Redmond
- The Renton Reporter – Renton
- The Facts – Seattle
- Madison Park Times – Seattle
- North Seattle Journal – Seattle
- Puget Sound Business Journal – Seattle
- The Seattle Medium – Seattle
- Queen Anne & Magnolia News – Seattle
- Sequim Gazette – Sequim
- Shelton-Mason County Journal – Shelton
- Snohomish County Tribune – Snohomish
- Black Lens News – Spokane
- Spokane Journal of Business – Spokane
- Stanwood Camano News – Stanwood
- Skamania County Pioneer – Stevenson
- Pierce County Weekly – Tacoma
- Tenino Independent & Sun News – Tenino
- Methow Valley News – Twisp
- Vashon-Maury Island Beachcomber – Vashon
- Key Peninsula News – Vaughn
- Waitsburg Times – Waitsburg
- Woodinville Weekly – Woodinville
- Nisqually Valley News – Yelm

== Alternative newspapers ==
- Inlander – Spokane
- The Stranger – Seattle
- Redmond Moments Newspaper – Redmond
- Weekly Volcano – Tacoma

== Trade newspapers ==
- Puget Sound Business Journal – Seattle
- Seattle Daily Journal of Commerce – Seattle

== Digital only newspapers ==
- Bothell-Kenmore Reporter – Bothell
- Bellevue Reporter – Bellevue
- Covington Reporter – Covington
- The Journal of Olympia, Lacey & Tumwater - Tumwater
- Kirkland Reporter – Kirkland
- Northwest Asian Weekly – Seattle
- Seattle Post-Intelligencer – Seattle
- Seattle Weekly – Seattle
- The Voice of the Valley – Maple Valley

== Student newspapers ==
- Bellevue College – The Jibsheet (renamed to "The Watchdog")
- Central Washington University – The Observer
- Clark College – The Independent
- Eastern Washington University – The Easterner
- Edmonds College – The Triton Review
- Evergreen State College – Cooper Point Journal
- Everett Community College – The Clipper
- Gonzaga University – The Gonzaga Bulletin
- Green River Community College – The Current
- Pacific Lutheran University – The Mooring Mast
- Pierce College, Puyallup – The Puyallup Post
- Pierce College, Fort Steilacoom – Pierce Pioneer
- Seattle Central Community College – The Seattle Collegian
- Seattle Pacific University – The Falcon
- Seattle University – The Spectator
- Shoreline Community College – The Ebbtide
- Spokane Falls Community College – The Communicator
- University of Puget Sound – The Puget Sound Trail
- University of Washington – The Daily of the University of Washington
- University of Washington Tacoma – The Ledger
- Walla Walla University – The Collegian
- Washington State University – The Daily Evergreen
- Washington State University Vancouver – The VanCougar
- Western Washington University – Western Front
- Whitman College – The Pioneer
- Whitworth University – The Whitworthian

== Defunct newspapers ==
See: Category:Defunct newspapers published in Washington

- The Argus
- The Arlington Times
- The Bellingham Business Journal
- The Chehalis Advocate
- The Chehalis Bee
- The Chehalis Bee-Nugget
- The Chehalis Nugget
- Columbia Basin News
- The Daily Hub
- The Enterprise
- King County Journal
- Marysville Globe
- Monroe Monitor and Valley News
- Northwest Passage
- Northwest Hawai'i Times
- Olympia Pioneer and Democrat
- Othello Outlook
- Sabot
- San Juan Islander
- The Seattle Star
- Seattle Union Record
- Spokane Daily Chronicle
- Spokane Natural
- The Vancouver Voice

== See also ==
Comprehensive

- Lists of newspapers
- List of newspapers in the United States

Frequency

- List of free daily newspapers in the United States
- List of weekly newspapers in the United States

Circulation

- List of international newspapers originating in the United States
- List of national newspapers in the United States
- List of newspapers in the United States by circulation

Foreign language

- List of French-language newspapers published in the United States
- List of German-language newspapers published in the United States
- List of Spanish-language newspapers published in the United States

Specialty

- List of African-American newspapers in the United States
- List of alternative weekly newspapers in the United States
- List of business newspapers in the United States
- List of family-owned newspapers in the United States
- List of Jewish newspapers in the United States
- List of LGBTQ periodicals in the United States
- List of student newspapers in the United States
- List of supermarket tabloids in the United States
- List of underground press in the United States

Other

- List of defunct newspapers of the United States
