= List of newspapers in Washington =

List of newspapers in Washington may refer to:

- List of newspapers in Washington (state)
- List of newspapers in Washington, D.C.
