= Tent City 4 =

Homeless encampment in Seattle, United States

Tent City 4 is a homeless encampment of up to 100 persons operated by homeless residents and sponsored by 501(c)(3) organizations Seattle Housing and Resources Effort (SHARE) and Women's Housing Equality and Enhancement League (WHEEL). The camp was created in May 2004 and limits itself to places of worship in eastern King County outside of Seattle. Minors are not allowed in Tent City 4, although there is a provision for emergency situations. Residents may use their own tents or community tents that are segregated by gender. Dumpsters, portable toilets and a shower, paid for by SHARE, are provided to address sanitation concerns. In order to control access to the encampment, there is only one entry/exit to the camp that is guarded at all times.

Tent City 4's meanderings are often met with stiff resistance from some residents of the communities it moves into. King County and many of the cities therein have subsequently established land-use codes in an attempt to balance the desire of faith-based organizations to host the camp and the concerns of some of its neighbors over health and safety.

== History ==
=== Brickyard Park and Ride - Near Bothell (May 2004) ===
SHARE members announced intention to begin encampment in a county-owned park. King County Executive Ron Sims initially arranged to site Tent City 4 on county-owned wetlands adjoining a park-and-ride lot near Interstate 405 and N.E. 160th Street. The local community group Brickyard Community For Fair Process filed a lawsuit to prevent the move, noting that the land was too close to an environmentally sensitive area, and that there was no public notice or process involved in the siting. In legal discovery, the property in question was identified as Metro Transit, not King County property, and as such was subject to a law prohibiting camping on transit property.

=== St. Brendan's Catholic Church—Bothell (May 2004-August 2004) ===
With the pending loss of the Brickyard site Ron Sims brokered a last minute deal to locate the camp on vacant church owned land near St. Brendan's Catholic Church. Since the City of Bothell was excluded from the meetings held by Sims, resulting in a lack of advance notice, and the encampment refusing to abide by the cities permitting process, the city felt it had to take the church and SHARE to court in order to stipulate conditions of occupancy. The court ruled that SHARE and the Church must obtain a permit for the encampment. The Bothell City Council elected to conduct their own quasi-judicial hearings, rather than use a hearing examiner. On July 19, 2004, two months after TC4 assumed occupancy of the site and after weeks of public testimony, the committee approved a land use permit by a unanimous vote that included several conditions that the church and camp were required to meet.

=== Northshore United Church of Christ—Woodinville (August–November 2004) ===
NUCC invited Tent City 4 to relocate to its property, and applied to the city of Woodinville for a temporary use permit. Woodinville City council proposed moving Tent City 4 to an undeveloped plot of park property for 40 days while NUCC and SHARE pursued permits to stay for an additional 60 days. The site was seen as preferable due to its location in an industrial, rather than residential, area.

In exchange for the use of this site NUCC, and SHARE signed an agreement with the City of Woodinville which stated that SHARE and any church sponsor, "must agree not to establish, sponsor or support any homeless encampment within the City of Woodinville without a valid temporary use permit issued by the city".

In order to gain an additional 60 days in Woodinville SHARE agreed to identify its next potential site and to legally obtain the proper permits by September 25, 2004. SHARE violated this agreement by refusing to identify the next site and failing to file for a permit in time to obtain one before the move date.

In July 2009, the Washington State Supreme Court sided with Tent City and NUCC over the City of Woodinville.

=== St. John Vianney Catholic Church—Finn Hill (November 2004-February 2005) ===
St. John's, near Kirkland, filed a request for a temporary use permit with the county on October 28 to allow TC4 to locate on church property beginning November 22. On November 9, Church leaders announced it was their intention to begin moving TC4 onto church property beginning November 19, but some residents protested that 10 days was insufficient notice. A community opposition group sued, and won, in order to get the same conditions for health and safety that previous host communities had obtained, and Tent City 4 took up residency for a 90-day period.

=== Kirkland Congregational Church—Kirkland (February–May 2005) ===
Kirkland Congregational Church members voted to invite TC4 to locate on church property. Opponents filed suit again, citing similar reasons of insufficient notice. They were issued a TRO by the court requiring the encampment to abide by the same conditions required at previous sites. The Kirkland City Council allowed TC4 to move to Kirkland Congregational in February under the condition that SHARE sign an agreement to not locate in Kirkland before August, 2006.

=== Lake Washington United Methodist Church—Kirkland (May–August 2005) ===
A month after its move to KCCUCC, TC4 received an invitation to locate on the property of Lake Washington United Methodist Church. The City of Kirkland revised its code to allow a second consecutive stay. This allowed the church to file for a permit 30 days in advance and for the first time since its creation, TC4 arrives at a location with permits in hand.

=== Woodinville Unitarian Universalist Church—Cottage Lake near Woodinville (August–November 2005) ===
WUUC was the first church to apply for a permit under King County's new rules for homeless encampments. A determination was made by DDES that a permit was not required so despite the intention of allowing public process TC4 was allowed to move in without permits.

=== Temple B'nai Torah—Bellevue's Crossroads area (November 2005-February 2006) ===
Under its new permitting process Tent City 4 was limited by the City of Bellevue to 40 residents and 60 days duration. These limits were a result of the resources the Temple had available, and resulted in the Church and SHARE filing a lawsuit against the City of Bellevue to challenge the rules. The parties negotiated a consent decree where TC4 and its supporters acknowledged that Bellevue was within its rights to adopt these code changes in exchange for allowing TC4 to stay 90 days at the Temple and St Luke's sites in Bellevue and agreeing not to return to the city for one year.

=== St. Luke's Lutheran Church—Bellevue's North Towne community (February–May 2006) ===
SHARE and the City of Bellevue reached agreements in mediation leading to a second stay within Bellevue City limits, and TC4 relocated at St. Luke's Lutheran Church. The site's proximity to active bus routes, shopping center, and nearby freeways made for better access to services for the residents.

=== Northshore United Church of Christ—Woodinville (May–August 2006) ===
Less than two weeks before the proposed move date, NUCC requested that Woodinville once again provide the public park property for use by TC4 for a period of 60 days. If the city was unwilling, the church publicly announced a plan to relocate on church property for 90 days without further permit procedures. The city council declined to make the park available and informed the church that it would face a full legal response and code enforcement effort if it went ahead with the move. Despite these warnings, NUCC allowed TC4 to relocate to church property on May 13. The city filed a motion for a Temporary Restraining Order with King County Superior Court on May 12, which was denied by Judge Palmer Robinson after reviewing the city's briefing and hearing oral argument. Instead the judge issued a temporary restraining order preventing the city from taking code enforcement action until a May 24 hearing, thus allowing TC4 to move onto church property, subject to certain conditions. Woodinville filed for injunctive relief, breach of contract, and collection of damages with the King County Superior Court. On May 30, Judge Charles Mertel ordered the sides to mediation to be conducted daily while the case was being heard. This mediation failed to result in a settlement. The city also sought financial restitution for private and public security costs. On June 9, Judge Mertel ruled the encampment and church were in violation of their 2004 agreement with the city and ordered the encampment to vacate the site by midnight June 17. On June 13, NUCC and SHARE/WHEEL filed an appeal with the state Court of Appeals arguing that the city's land use code is an unconstitutional infringement upon the church's religious expression, that the church did not violate the 2004 agreement between the church and city, and that the church was denied its constitutional right to a trial by jury. On June 16 the Washington State Court of Appeals issued a stay of the trial court's decision pending the resolution of the appeal. The City appealed the stay, but the stay was affirmed by a full panel of appellate judges. The City's request for attorney fees was subsequently denied by Judge Mertel. Additionally, a Northeast District Judge in Redmond dismissed 28 misdemeanor citations from the city against a SHARE/WHEEL employee by ruling that the city was "without authority" to issue the citations. On February 26, 2007, Judge David Steiner ordered Woodinville to pay the $8,388 in attorneys' fees needed to defend the SHARE employee.

On Thursday, July 16, 2009 the Washington State Supreme Court ruled unanimously that the City of Woodinville was incorrect in denying the church's permit application. The decision was hailed as a victory by local religious leaders and the Seattle Times.

=== First Evangelical Lutheran Church—Bothell (Proposed for August 2006) ===
The city of Bothell initially announced on June 5, 2006 that First Evangelical Lutheran Church filed a permit request under the city's new homeless encampment ordinance and was issued a permit to do so on August 11, subject to more than 20 conditions relating to size, layout, setbacks, security, noise, public health, fire safety and other aspects of Tent City4's operation. The homeless encampment and church rejected the permit, citing the number of conditions when added together was too onerous. The condition they most strongly objected to was a requirement that all residents have a warrant check conducted, despite already voluntarily doing so through the King County Sheriff's Office.

Despite TC4 not moving to First Evangelical, the City of Bothell issued a $4,000 bill to cover the costs associated with processing the permit. According to the co-leader for the church's homeless community mission team, the bill is abnormally high in comparison to the permit fees required by other municipalities. However, according to Bothell's community-development director, the bill is in accordance with the city's land use application policy and the church dropped their objections and paid the bill.

In January 2007, after Bothell's Planning Department relented on the requirement for a temporary landscape screen of pyramidalis trees, SHARE and the Church dropped their appeal of the permit conditions and accepted the permit as revised. While the permit remains valid for one year there is no indication that SHARE intends to accept the Churches invitation to host the encampment.

=== Woodinville Unitarian Universalist Church—Cottage Lake near Woodinville (August - November 2006) ===
After refusing to accept the permit issued in Bothell, Tent City 4 asked for and obtained a permit from King County, and moved to Woodinville Unitarian Universalist Church on August 12, which became the first location to host the tent city twice.

=== St. John Vianney Catholic Church—Finn Hill (November 2006-February 2007) ===
In May 2006 the Pastor announced in his monthly newsletter that they intend to host Tent City 4 for a second time and become part of a permanent rotation. On Veterans Day, Tent City 4 moved onto the grounds of St. John Vianney Catholic Church to begin their three-month stay at the church.

=== St. Jude Church—Redmond (February–May 2007) ===
On December 21, 2006, the city of Redmond approved a land use permit request that was filed by St. Jude Church on November 14 to host Tent City 4 starting February 11 subject to twelve conditions. The move would represent the first time Tent City 4 has been to Redmond. Ten appeals where filed by parties of record by the deadline January 5 including one from St Jude's & SHARE/WHEEL. Four of which were summarily dismissed, three prior to the appeal hearing and one at the hearing when the appellant failed to appear.

On February 5, 2007, the Appeal Hearing Examiner vacated the permit ruling that Redmond violated city code by issuing the permit without bringing the issue before the city council and remanded the issue back to the city of Redmond for further consideration. The church filed an appeal on the decision with the hearing before the City Council scheduled for March 6.

Despite being warned that hosting the camp without a permit would violate city codes and subject the church fines of up to $500 per day, Church leadership decided to host the encampment starting February 10. The stay could end up costing the church more than $37,000, which it says it will pay with donations, not parish funds. On March 27, the Redmond City Council voted 5-1 and overturned the Appeal Hearing Examiner's ruling and reinstated the temporary land use permit. On May 11, the Redmond voided all fines applied to St. Jude for housing the encampment prior to the March 27 reinstatement.

=== Episcopal Church of the Resurrection—Bellevue (May–August 2007) ===
Tent City 4 moved to Episcopal Church of the Resurrection in Bellevue on May 19.

=== The Community Church of Issaquah—Issaquah (August–November 2007) ===
The Community Church of Issaquah applied for a permit with the Issaquah Planning Department in order to have Tent City 4 move onto its property from August 11 to November 10. The permit was granted and the encampment moved to the church on August 11.

== Controversy over Tent City 4 ==
While some religious and spiritual communities, organizations, and community members have welcomed and supported the presence of Tent City 4 in east King County, Tent City 4 has also encountered vocal and active opposition from other residents of the communities where it has moved. Part of this opposition is because Tent City 4 has located itself on properties without permits in many of the cities to which it moves. Despite assurances and reports by the King County Sheriff's Office and other local police departments that there have been no increases in crime rates in areas where TC4 has been located, this opposition has also been fueled by a concern about the impact TC4 has on crime rates in the nearby area. Many suburban cities have created code amendments for permits in an attempt to balance the desires of churches to host the encampments with community desires for rules that address their public safety and welfare concerns.

After Tent City 4 found its first home in Bothell, the City of Bothell filed suit to evict the camp. Central to the lawsuit was the claim that due to TC4's proximity to four schools and the potential financial damage that might be incurred, the encampment was an undue burden on the city. Bothell attempted to require the encampment's residents to provide identification for warrant checks, require the church either to hire private security or to pay overtime to the Bothell Police, and to provide liability insurance of at least $1 million. A judge hearing the issue refused to order these conditions, but did order SHARE/WHEEL to obtain permits for this and future encampments. Woodinville has also submitted the costs of private security patrols and liability insurance to NUCC and SHARE, but TC4 contends these security charges are unwarranted due to SHARE's existing security detail. The city contends that SHARE's security only covers the encampment, not the surrounding area, so the patrols are necessary. The issue remains a point of contention.

King County Council member Carolyn Edmonds proposed that a citizens' commission be formed to study the siting issues. On June 1, 2004, the council voted to create the King County Citizens' Advisory Commission on Homelessness and Encampments (CACHE) to recommend policies and guidelines for dealing with homelessness.

On August 13, 2004, CACHE submitted its final report citing a need for homeless encampments "because current regional efforts are inadequate to meet the needs of homeless men, women and families" and approving the use of both public and private land to house the homeless encampments as a short-term solution. On the same day the dissenting members of the commission submitted their report to the council, finding fault with the way the members of CACHE were selected, how the data was collected and used, and a general feeling that the report was affected more by inputs from special interest groups and county staff than the citizens it was formed to represent. The report also included recommendations for the handling of homeless encampments and alternatives to them. The council included the report in the record, and voted to direct the executive to consider its findings when drafting proposed legislation.

An article in The Woodinville Weekly quotes several Tent City 4 residents who criticized SHARE/WHEEL's operation of the encampments and alleged that some expensive, high-technology donations were sold at auction to raise funds.

The King County Council heard public testimony on February 7, 2005 on two pieces of amended legislation addressing the issue of homeless encampments in King County. This bi-partisan legislation, a result of months of compromise in an attempt to find a middle ground for all parties, was scrapped and a new one was drafted behind closed doors in exclusive negotiations between Councilmember Edmonds and the Church Council of Greater Seattle led by Rev. Sanford Brown. In May 2005 this new legislation was moved before, and passed by, the council after a full public hearing in a bipartisan vote.

The discord between faith-based organizations and cities over tent cities prompted members of the Democratic-controlled State legislature to introduce H.B. 2244 that would prohibit cities from preventing churches from housing tent cities and from limiting their stay to less than 90 days. The bill failed to make it to the floor for a vote.

== See also ==
- List of tent cities in the United States
- Dignity Village
- Tent City
