= Lake Chelan Mirror =

- Type: Weekly newspaper
- Owner(s): Ward Media, LLC
- Founder(s): DeWitt C. Britt
- Publisher: Terry Ward
- Founded: 1891; 134 years ago
- Language: English
- Headquarters: Chelan, Washington, United States
- Circulation: 3,000 (as of 2022)
- ISSN: 1078-1684
- OCLC number: 23184372
- Website: lakechelanmirror.com

The Lake Chelan Mirror is a weekly newspaper published Wednesdays in Chelan, Washington, United States. It covers Lake Chelan, Manson, Chelan, Entiat and the surrounding area, with a circulation of 2,900. Since 2023, the paper has been owned by Terry Ward and Amy Yaley, who also publish Leavenworth Echo, the Cashmere Valley Record, the Quad City Herald, and the Wenatchee Business Journal.

== History ==
The Chelan Falls Leader was first published by DeWitt C. Britt on August 6, 1891 in Chelan Falls. It was the second paper installed in Chelan County, Washington. The first issue was sent out a month later than its print date due to difficulties finding office space and the press getting damaged. Britt wrote "one delay after another - until we are truly glad to be on earth at all." A year later when his contract with the townsite owners expired, Britt moved his printing plant to Chelan and renamed the paper to the Chelan Leader on August 4, 1892. The Seattle Post-Intelligencer reported the paper defunct in 1896 after the it ceased publishing for three weeks without explanation. The paper issued a retraction when it was found out Britt went on holiday to Spokane, only intending to skip a single issue but instead missing three.

In summer 1908, Britt got sick and was incapacitated for several months. He grew ill again the following spring. He died on April 19, 1909. The paper's next editor was W. T. Heacock. In 1915, the Leader was sold to S. C. Colter, who also purchased the Lake Chelan News, founded by R. M. Horton about three years prior. The name was then changed to the Lake Chelan News-Leader. In 1917, Charles E. Goodsell became publisher. He died in 1924. His widow sold the paper a year later to W. Kenneth Kingman. The name was then changed to the Chelan Valley Mirror.

Kingman published the Mirror for 13 years until selling it in 1937 to Wilbur B. Gavin, who had previously worked at the Cashmere Valley Record. His old boss H. E. VanOmmeren helped in buy the Mirror when it was put up for sale. Gavin bought out VanOmmeren in 1941, becoming the sole-owner. Gavin, nicked named "Babe," published the Mirror for decades, even after losing his right arm to cancer in 1970. He died in 1999. His son Rick Gavin succeeded him as publisher in 1973. After his father's death, the paper was sold in September 2000 to Prairie Media, which later became NCW Media. In August 2023, NCW Media Inc. sold the paper and four others to Ward Media, LLC., owned by Terry Ward and Amy Yaley. At that time Ward became the paper's publisher.

== Resources & links ==
- Chelan Falls Leader (1891 - 1892) LOC entry
- D.C. Britt
- Chelan Leader (1892 - 1925) LOC entry
- Chelan Valley Mirror (1925 - 1991) LOC entry
- Library of Congress entry
- The Washington Newspaper - March 2012 Edition
- Washington State Library - List of State Newspapers
