= The Enterprise (Washington) =

Defunct weekly newspaper in Snohomish County, Washington, United States

- Type: Weekly newspaper
- Founder(s): Barry O'Connor; Orville Danforth
- Founded: 1958
- Ceased publication: 2012
- Language: English
- Country: Snohomish County, Washington

The Enterprise was a weekly newspaper based in Snohomish County, Washington, United States. It published several editions to serve the cities of Edmonds, Lynnwood, and Mountlake Terrace, from 1958 to 2009. The newspaper was acquired by The Everett Herald in 1996, where it was merged with a Shoreline newspaper, and ceased publication in 2012.

== History ==
In late 1958, Barry O'Connor and Orville E. Danforth left the Lynwood Weekly Reporter and launched a rival paper called The Enterprise. It was distributed for free in south Snohomish County, Washington. The new paper was first published on September 12, 1958, serving Edmonds and Lynnwood. A Mountlake Terrace edition was added in late 1958, followed by editions for northern King County communities in the 1970s that were later cancelled.

Simeon R. Wilson III, their former employer and owner of the Marysville Globe, sought a court injunction to stop O'Connor and Danforth from soliciting ads, claiming they started The Enterprise before they quit and were using his accounts and confidential information. A judge denied Wilson's request for a restraining order. Wilson then amended his lawsuit, now seeking $150,000 in damages.

In 1964, O'Connor and Danforth sold the paper. In 1965, Frank H. Beaver became editor, and then died a year later from injuries he sustained from a fight at a party. He was age 43. Around this time, The Enterprise was sold to the Lafromboise family, who also operated The Chronicle in Centralia. The Lafromboises also purchased the Edmonds Tribune-Review, which had been founded in 1910. The newspaper added a new edition to serve Mill Creek in the 1980s. It was sold again to The Everett Herald in 1996, where it absorbed Shoreline Week to produce a new edition. The four editions were consolidated into a single edition in 2009 and renamed to The Weekly Herald two years later. The Weekly Herald ceased publication on August 29, 2012, after failing to meet revenue expectations.
