= The Journal of Olympia, Lacey & Tumwater =

Online newspaper in Thurston County, Washington

- Type: Online newspaper
- Publisher: Danny Stusser
- Editor: Wyatt Haupt, Jr.
- Staff writers: 17 (2024)
- Operating budget: $340,000 (2025)
- Founded: May 2020
- Political alignment: Independent, non-partisan
- Language: English
- City: Tumwater, Washington
- Country: United States
- Circulation: 8,500 (daily) (as of 2025)
- Website: www.thejoltnews.com

The Journal of Olympia, Lacey & Tumwater, referred to as The JOLT and also known under the acronym, JOLT, is a non-profit digital news publication and organization that covers the Olympia, Lacey, and Tumwater metropolitan area. The news site, which focuses on regional issues, particularly government concerns and public hearings, first began operations in May 2020.

== History ==
The Journal of Olympia, Lacey & Tumwater (JOLT), also known as "The JOLT", is a non-profit, online newspaper and organization that began in May 2020. The digital publication was founded by its publisher, Danny Stusser. The news site originally began as a small business, converting to non-profit status in September 2021. The JOLT was granted a 501(c)(3) public-charity designation in March 2023. (Note: The classification of The JOLT's non-profit status was backdated by the IRS to September 2021.)

Stusser's idea for The JOLT came from a concern over the dwindling local coverage of the Lacey, Olympia, and Tumwater region, as well as the lack of in-house staffing at The Olympian, the main news organization in the county. Stusser, who had drawn up a business model for a local news site in 2011, had previously operated a restaurant news publication known as Coffee News. Due to a sudden lack of distribution caused by the shutdowns of dining establishments during the early onset of the COVID-19 pandemic, the venture was shuttered.

== Content ==
The model for The JOLT since its inception was to focus on "civic reporting", providing articles about various government meetings at the city and county levels as well as public hearings and school district news. The journal also reports on various topics, referred to as "service journalism", which includes articles on businesses, infrastructure, and weather in the local area. Approximately 95% of The JOLT's content is considered to be original reporting with local journalists at the outlet providing up to 40 original news articles per week.

Due to the journal's non-profit status, as well as Stusser's original business model for the publication, The JOLT is required to be an independent, non-partisan news organization and cannot promote nor endorse political candidates.

== Ownership and staffing ==
The news organization is overseen by a board of directors and is considered as "community owned".

As of 2024, the staff at The JOLT consisted of a total of 17 staff members, only two of which were considered to be full-time employees. Six journalists of the outlet were based in the Philippines.

== Funding ==
The JOLT is a free publication. It received a $100,000 grant in 2024 from Press Forward, a group created to help fund local news sources. In 2024, the journal reported expenses for the year at $200,000. The non-profit, in 2025, reported an annual operational budget of $340,000. Additional funding comes from donors and donorship programs; during the 2025 fiscal year, the newspaper announced donations from over 1,200 people, an increase of 30% over the prior year. National funding was noted to have decreased by 45% over the same period and revenues were "flat".

== Circulation and readership ==
A daily newsletter, known as The Daily JOLT, was reported to reach 8,500 readers each weekday by 2025.

== Awards ==
In 2024, The JOLT's photojournalism article, Homelessness in Olympia by JM Simpson and Stusser, was named a finalist for the Institute for Nonprofit News Nonprofit News Awards. The story won the award in the Micro Division of the Insight Award for Visual Journalism category.

== See also ==
- List of newspapers in Washington (state)
