= Willapa Harbor Herald =

Local newspaper in Washington, United States

- Type: Weekly newspaper
- Owner: Flannery Publications
- Managing editor: Karen Carter
- Founded: 1890
- Language: English
- Circulation: 5,141 (as of 2022)
- Sister newspapers: Lewis County News
- ISSN: 1065-3805
- OCLC number: 17331133
- Website: hometowndebate.com

The Willapa Harbor Herald is a newspaper that provides news coverage for the towns of Raymond and South Bend, Washington. The owner is Flannery Publications. It was founded in 1890 and has circulated under several names.

== History ==
=== South Bend Journal ===
The paper's earliest predecessor is the South Bend Journal, which was founded in 1890. F. A. Hazeltine became a part owner in 1891 and a full owner two years later. His son Ezra T. Hazeltine was made a partner in 1923 and worked as the Journal's editor and publisher from 1938 until selling the paper in 1962 to Leigh Duty, the paper's printing foreman.

North Pacific Press began publishing the paper in 1965. The following year Jack Laughlin sold his stock interest in the paper to company president Hal W. Schiltz.

=== Raymond Herald ===
The Raymond Herald was founded in 1905. In June 1910, J.J. Heath sold the Herald to his brother Val Heath, who previously worked at the Willapa Harbor Pilot owned by their father C. A. Heath. The Heath family sold the Pilot a few months later.

James McDedmott purchased the Raymond Herald in 1945. He published the paper until selling it to Clyde A. Eckman in January 1952. Later that year in August, Eckman purchased the Raymond Advertiser from Arther Bailey and his son Arther Bailey. He then merged the Advertiser into his Herald.

=== Merger ===
In 1983, the Raymond Herald merged with the South Bend Journal, which had previously been merged with the Willapa Harbor Pilot, to form the Willapa Harbor Herald.

On July 1, 2019, Sound Publishing sold the Pacific County Press to Flannery Publications, owner of the Willapa Harbor Herald. The Press dated back to 1994 and was subsequently absorbed into the Herald.

== See also ==
List of newspapers in Washington (state)
