= The Daily Hub =

Former newspaper in Centralia, Washington

- The Daily Hub nameplate, October 29, 1914
- Type: Daily newspaper
- Format: Broadsheet
- Publisher: Hub Printing Company
- President: M.E. Cue
- Founded: February 1913
- Ceased publication: April 10, 1921
- Language: English
- City: Centralia, Washington
- Country: United States
- Price: $5.00 annual subscription (1914)
- OCLC number: 17315549

The Daily Hub was a daily newspaper published and circulated in Centralia, Washington. The newspaper began in February 1913 and ceased publication in April 1921 due to financial difficulties.

== History ==
The first issue of The Daily Hub was circulated in February 1913 (Note: Sourcing has yet to be found stating the exact date of the first issue of the newspaper.) and the publication was printed by the Hub Printing Company. The newspaper was started by M.E. Cue, previously from Kelso, Washington.

By approximately October 1915, the newspaper was reported by the Seattle Post-Intelligencer to have "huge stores of cash". The Hub proclaimed that they had the largest circulation in the region into 1916; the publication further mentioned that they were proud to have amassed a "bunch of enemies" from the "lawless and predatory elements" within the city of Centralia, Washington.

In March 1916, the company moved to larger headquarters in the downtown district of Centralia at 110 Tower Avenue. The Daily Hub reported that the larger, 2,400-square-foot (220 m^{2}) space was to better accommodate the growing publication and its customers; the paper considered itself "Centralia's favorite newspaper" that was both "fair and fearless". At the time, the company also published a sister newspaper, The Weekly Hub. (Note: Prior to the 1916 relocation, correspondence with The Daily Hub was sent to Box 398 in Centralia. The office's phone number was 191.)

In 1918, The Daily Hub became known briefly as The Centralia Evening Hub, along with the paper's Sunday edition, The Centralia Sunday Hub. The Sunday edition's first issue was printed on March 31, 1918. The same year, the publication changed its nameplate to The Centralia Daily Hub.

=== Publication ceases ===
The last issue of the newspaper was published on April 10, 1921. President and publisher Cue (Note: In 1915, M.E. Cue had been charged, though acquitted, with "throwing a pig of linotype metal" at a Centralia theater owner.) stated in an announcement that the closure was temporary, due to "financial reverses", and other circumstances over which the printing company and management had "no control". Further reporting mentioned that the closure of a bank in Kelso, which "held papers against the Hub", was a leading cause of the suspension of the publication; the newspaper's debt was reported as possibly able to be refinanced.

In 1976, editors and staff at the Centralia newspaper, The Daily Chronicle, expressed a lack of awareness and knowledge of The Daily Hub after having been presented an old copy of the newspaper by a local resident.

== Publishing aspects ==
Hub printing services advertisement, 1919

=== Printing ===
By 1914, The Daily Hub circulated every afternoon but did not print issues on Sundays.

The newspaper's font, by 1917, was 8-point Roman type and was criticized in The Pacific Printer and Publisher to be "too heavy". Describing the type as a "mile and a quarter high", it was further characterized as "spotted" and "unpleasant" to the reader. The Hub Printing Company began using a "seven-column quatro" printing press in 1918.

=== Subscriptions ===
Subscriptions to The Daily Hub in 1914 and into 1916 could be purchased in one week or month options, $0.10 and $0.45 respectively. Paid-in-advance options for daily delivery included three months at $1.25, a six-month term for $2.50, a nine-month plan for $3.75, or a year-long contract priced at $5.00. The paper could be delivered via the Centralia Post Office as "second-class matter" for a full-year plan at a cost of $2.50. Out of town subscribers originally paid an annual fee of $2.50; the fee was increased to $4.00 in 1915, a dollar less than Centralia residents.

The Weekly Hub offered two options in 1914, a six-month subscription for $0.75 or a year-long term at $1.50.

== Competing local newspapers ==
Competing newspapers in Centralia during the time included The Chronicle-News Examiner. The paper changed its moniker to The Daily Chronicle in 1916, eventually becoming known succinctly as The Chronicle.

The twin city of Chehalis was home to The Chehalis Bee-Nugget and The People's Advocate.

== Recognition and criticism ==
When the cessation of The Daily Hub was announced in 1921, a Seattle-based version of the Industrial Worker wrote that the Hub was among many "devotees of capitalism". The publication continued that The Daily Hub was "willing to stoop to murder" as well as "condoning murder", accusing the Hub of having "helped stage", as well as being a "co-conspirator" to, the Centralia Tragedy. The loss of the Hub was compared to the way "all things criminal" are usually handled; the Industrial Worker ended the editorial by mockingly quoting scripture, believing the end of The Daily Hub was the beginning of one of many similar publications soon to follow.

== See also ==
- List of newspapers in Washington (state)
