= Sandy Brown (writer) =

American writer, activist, and minister

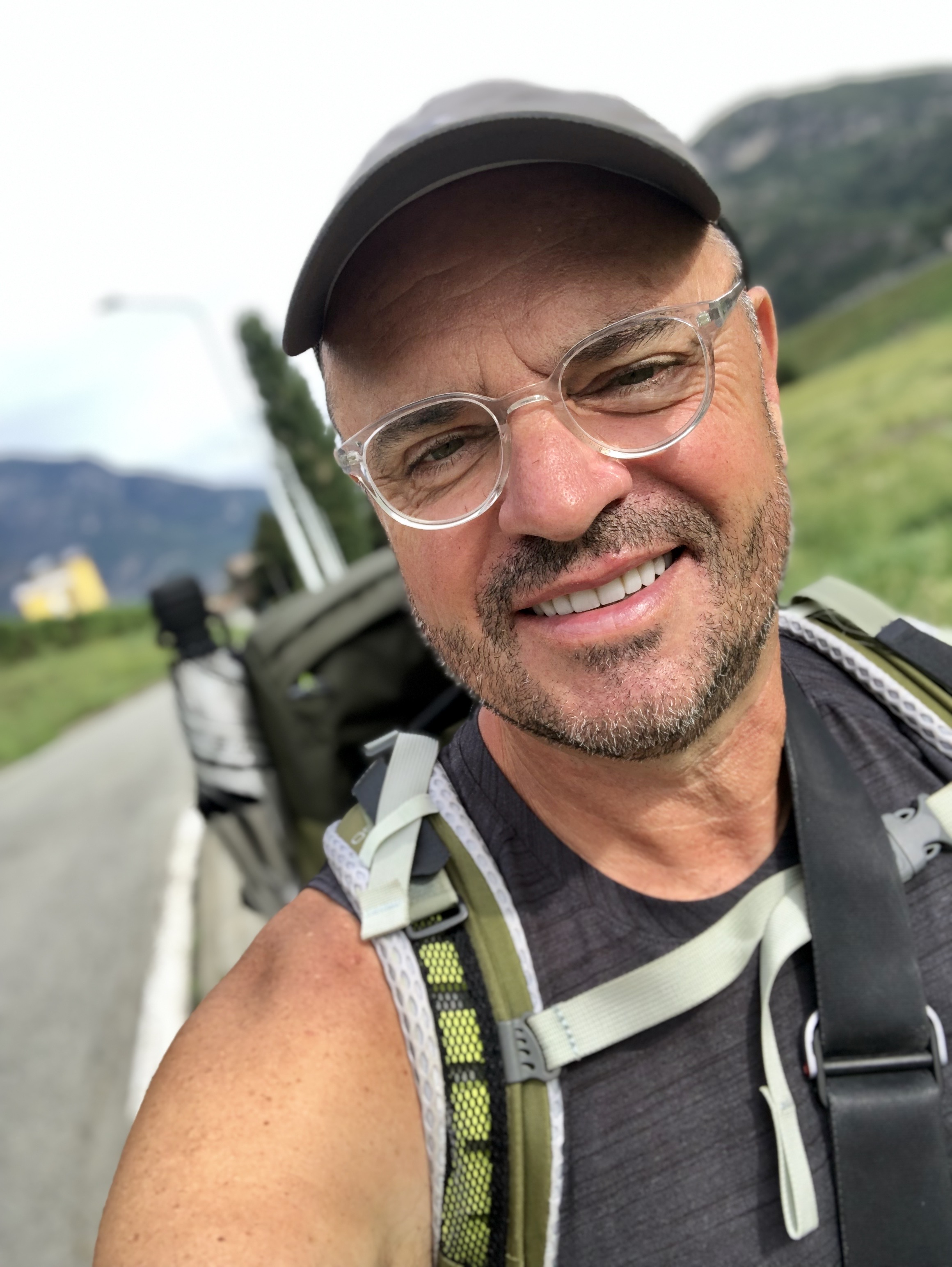
Sanford "Sandy" Brown

Sanford "Sandy" Brown (born 1957) is an American travel writer, tour guide, and United Methodist minister from the Seattle, Washington area. He has been a leader in advocacy against homelessness and gun violence and in favor of marriage equality.

== Education ==
Brown was born in Lancaster, California, in 1957 and moved to Seattle with his family in 1965. A graduate of Evergreen High School in 1975, Brown went on to receive his Bachelor of Arts degree from the University of Washington in 1978, his M.Div. from Garrett-Evangelical Theological Seminary in 1982 and his doctorate from Princeton Theological Seminary in 1997.

== Pastoral service ==
He was ordained a United Methodist deacon in 1979 and became an elder in the church in 1984. He served the Fall City United Methodist Church in Fall City, Washington, from 1982 to 1986, the Lake Washington United Methodist Church in Kirkland, Washington, from 1986 to 1992, and was senior pastor of the First United Methodist Church of Wenatchee, Washington, from 1992 until 2001. He served as senior pastor of First United Methodist Church aka First Church of Seattle Washing from 2008 to 2014.

== Public office, contested election ==
Brown was elected to the Board of Directors of the Lake Washington School District in 1989 in one of his first acts of public service beyond the local church. He served as president of the board from 1991 to 1992 during its AIDS education controversy. He ran unsuccessfully for school board in the Wenatchee School District in 1997.

Brown gained local notoriety for his challenge, along with Rev. Kel Groseclose, of the 1999 election of the Wenatchee mayor. Brown and Groseclose contended in Chelan County Superior Court that Mayor Gary Schoessler was not a resident of Wenatchee for the requisite one year prior to his election. The court agreed, the verdict was upheld on appeal to the Washington Supreme Court on April 20, 2000, and Schoessler was removed from office. Republicans chose the same venue in an unsuccessful challenge to the 2004 Washington governor’s election.

== Break from pastoral work ==
In 2001 Brown left the pastorate to serve as executive director of Deaconess Children's Services, a United Methodist mission agency, in Everett. In 2003 he was elected as executive director of the Church Council of Greater Seattle, one of the largest regional ecumenical bodies in the U.S.

At the Church Council, Brown's work has focused on ending homelessness. He advocated for acceptance of Tent City 4, helping the homeless encampment with legal challenges in several suburban Seattle communities, leading to a successful challenge in the Washington State Supreme Court against the City of Woodinville on behalf of the Northshore United Church of Christ and he has been leader of the legislative advocacy arm of the Committee to End Homelessness in King County.

Brown has authored numerous op-ed pieces in support of ending homelessness as well as other topics, such as bringing an end to conflict in the Middle East and (with his former wife) has advocated for high ethical standards in the practice of medicine. He has also written on the subject of living wages and the need for additional human service funding as leader of the successful 2005 Veterans and Human Services levy.

While at the council, Brown led in the establishment of the Service of Hope, an interfaith program that brings a service of prayer to sites of homicides. Services of Hope were held at sites of the Capitol Hill massacre and the Jewish Federation shooting. Brown was criticized by Ken Schramm of KOMO-TV for considering a prayer service for the killer of a police officer simultaneously with the service for the officer himself

In 2005 Brown received the Distinguished Alumnus Award from Garrett-Evangelical Theological Seminary. In 2007, former Bishop Edward Paup announced his intention to appoint Brown to serve as senior pastor of the First United Methodist Church in Seattle beginning in July 2008.

== Senior pastor, First United Methodist Church of Seattle ==
From 2008 to 2014, Brown was senior pastor of First United Methodist Church of Seattle, Seattle's first church and oldest ongoing organization. Brown oversaw the construction and successful move of First United Methodist Church from 5th and Marion, where First United Methodist Church congregation had worshiped since 1908, to a new $18 million building in the Belltown neighborhood of Seattle on 2nd and Denny. He helped the church secure $1 million in funds from King County and the City of Seattle for the Blaine Center Men's Shelter, connected to the new Belltown location of the church.

During his time as senior pastor, Brown led the religious community’s support of Referendum 74, the successful referendum for marriage equality in Washington, and condemned United Methodist policy on same sex marriage. After leading public marches promoting gun safety following the Sandy Hook Massacre he helped organize the Washington Alliance for Gun Responsibility and the successful Initiative Measure No. 594, promoting background checks for firearm sales and transfers in Washington State. During his vacation time, Brown traveled to Spain and walked the Camino de Santiago.

In 2015, Brown ran for Seattle City Council, tallying second place in the primary and losing in the general election to Debora Juarez. The following year, he established his travel business, Pilgrim Paths, that offers group and self-guided tours on pilgrimage paths in Europe.

== Travel books and the Caminoist ==
In 2015, Cicerone Press published his travel book, The Way of St Francis: From Florence to Assisi and Rome, and Brown became a travel speaker for Rick Steves.

In February 2017, Brown was appointed permanent lead pastor at Edmonds United Methodist Church in Edmonds, Washington, after serving as the interim pastor for seven months. In June 2019, Brown left his ministry as lead pastor at Edmonds United Methodist Church to become a full-time travel writer and tour guide.

He released a guidebook in January 2020 on the Camino de Santiago. followed by a three-volume guidebook series on the Via Francigena. In 2023 he released a guidebook for the California Missions Trail. Additionally, he leads travel groups on the Camino de Santiago as well as caminos following the paths of Saint Francis and the Via Francigena.

== Bibliography ==
- The Way of St Francis - Via di Francesco: From Florence to Assisi and Rome (Kendal, UK: Cicerone Press, 2015, reprinted 2017 and 2019) ISBN 9781852846268
- Camino de Santiago - Camino Francés: Guide and Map Book, includes Finisterre Finish (Kendall, UK: Cicerone Press, 2020, reprinted 2022) ISBN 9781786310040
- Walking the Via Francigena Part 1: Canterbury to Lausanne (Kendall, UK: Cicerone Press, 2023) ISBN 9781852848842
- Walking the Via Francigena Part 2: Lausanne to Lucca (Kendall, UK: Cicerone Press, 2021) ISBN 9781786310866
- Walking the Via Francigena Part 3: Lucca to Rome (Kendall, UK: Cicerone Press, 2021) ISBN 9781786310798
- Hiking and Cycling the California Missions Trail: from Sonoma to San Diego (Kendall, UK: Cicerone Press, 2023) ISBN 9781786311139
