= Kelley Loe =

- Born: July 4, 1881; Modena, Missouri
- Died: September 4, 1957 (aged 76); Portland, Oregon

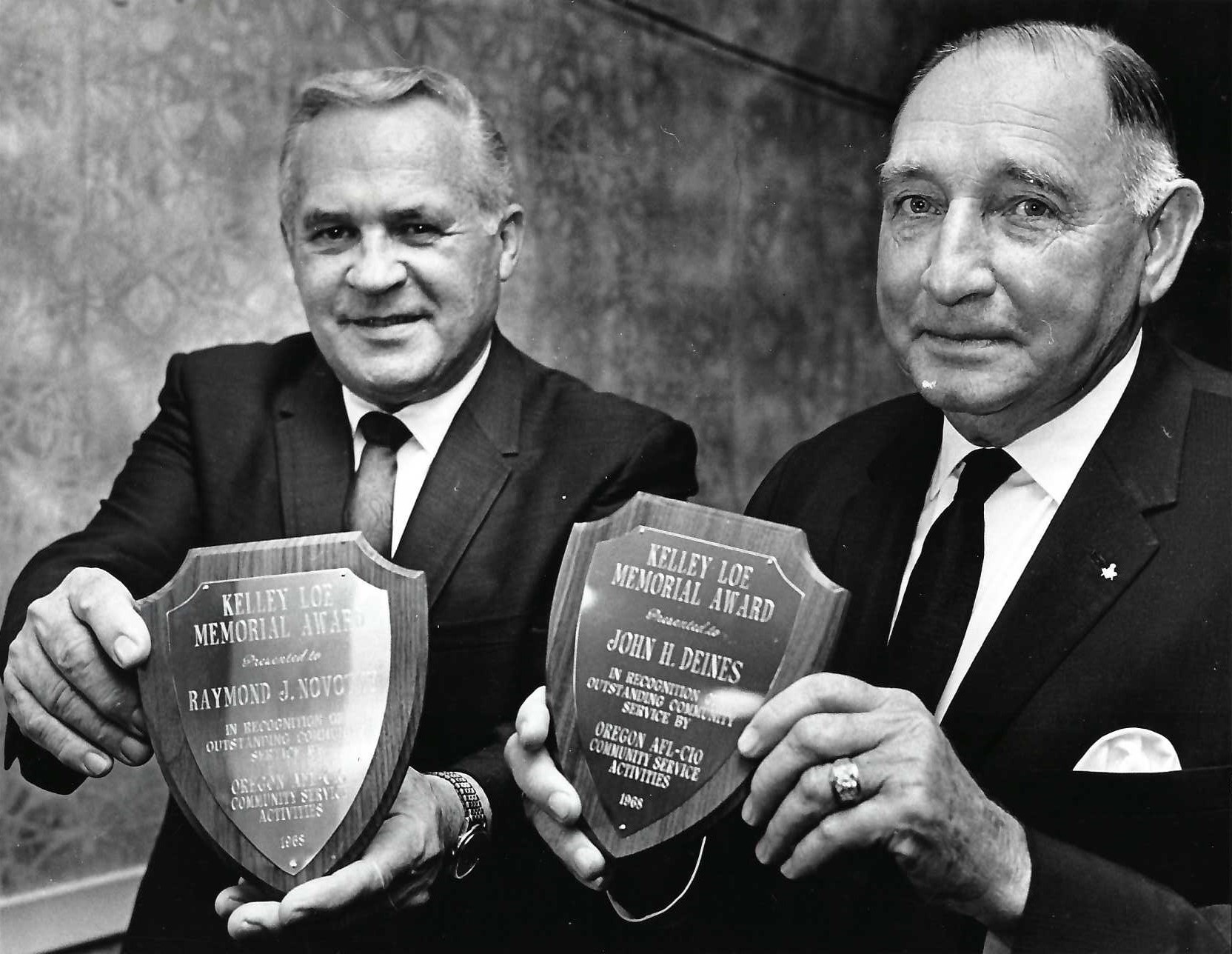
Raymond J. Novotny, left, Veterans Administration official, and John H. Deines, retired secretary of Teamsters Local No. 220, were recipients of the 12th annual Kelley Loe Memorial Awards presented by the AFL-CIO Community Services Department.

Oscar Kelley Loe (July 4, 1881 – September 4, 1957), known as Kelley Loe, was a U.S. labor activist, writer, and newspaper proprietor in the Pacific Northwest during the first half of the 20th century.

Loe was a native of Mercer County, Missouri, where he married Maude Amanda Miller on December 31, 1900. They soon moved to Klickitat County, Washington, where their daughter Marjorie was born in 1906.

After moving to Washington, Loe founded the LaCamas Post of Camas, Washington, owning and editing the newspaper in 1908. (It later became the Camas Post-Record and survived until 1965.)

Loe then moved several miles west and founded The Reflector of Ridgefield, Washington, owning and editing that newspaper from 1909 to 1910. (It later became The Reflector, and is still in publication, now in Battle Ground, Washington.)

During the Great Depression, Loe was a spokesman and organizer for the American Federation of Labor.

He died in Portland, Oregon, five years after the death of his wife.. Both husband and wife are buried in Portland's River View Cemetery.

Upon his death and in his honor, beginning in 1957 and through the 1970s, the Labor's Community Service Agency, a labor-affiliated charity organization in Portland, Oregon, gave a "Kelley Loe Award" for distinguished service.

== Writings ==
- An Army of the Aged. Caldwell : Caxton Press, 1936. (Co-written by Richard L. Neuberger.)
