= Port Townsend Leader =

Weekly newspaper published in Port Townsend, Washington

Port Townsend & Jefferson County Leader
- Type: Weekly newspaper
- Founder: W.L. Jones
- Publisher: Lloyd Mullen
- Editor: James Robinson
- Founded: 1889
- Language: English
- Headquarters: 226 Adams Street; Port Townsend, Washington
- Circulation: 7,065 (as of 2022)
- ISSN: 1532-4788
- OCLC number: 43485202
- Website: ptleader.com

The Port Townsend & Jefferson County Leader is a weekly newspaper published in Port Townsend, Washington.

== History ==
On October 2, 1889, W.L. Jones published the first edition of The Morning Leader in Port Townsend, Washington. In May 1890, Jones, due to poor health, sold the Leader to J.E. Clarke and Alfred H. Winterode for $15,000. That December, a stock company called Key City Publishing Co., acquired the paper. The business was managed by J. Will Lysons and Albert Searle. Lysons succeeded Clarke as editor. Unbeknownst to the public at the time, John McGraw was the majority stock owner. In

In November 1892, McGraw was elected the second governor of Washington. In April 1893, Governor McGraw sold his controlling shares to Lysons and Newton W. O'Rear. Later that year O'Rear was put on trial for forgery of county warrants and orders. He was acquitted. In 1896, a newspaper falsely reported Jones, who founded the Leader, had committed suicide. This was disproven when he showed up to work the next day. In May 1906, Wallace B. Jessup bought the Leader and succeeded O'Rear as editor. Winslow Morgan McCurdy became the owner about two years later. W.B. McCurdy's father William Augustus Curdy Jr., immigrated to Port Townsend from New Brunswick, Canada and was a cousin of the city's co-founder Francis Pettygrove.

In February 1922, W.M. McCurdy was appointed postmaster of Port Townsend. In July 1928, W.M. McCurdy died at age 50 from the effects of Blood-poisoning contracted while blackberry picking. His son Richard F. McCurdy then operated the paper. In November 1942, R.F. McCurdy enlisted in the U.S. Army Infantry during World War II. He was sent to Germany in 1944 where he was injured by a projectile. He eventually bought a majority interest in the Leader upon returning home. In 1960, the McCurdy family moved to Mallorca.

In 1967, Frank W. Garred bought the paper from R. F. McCurdy. At some point Garred became Leader co-owner with Scott Wilson. In January 1998, the two bought a 50% stake in Olympic View Publishing, a media company founded by Brown M. Maloney that published several newspapers including the Forks Forum and the Sequim Gazette. Maloney bought out Garred and Wilson from OVP four years later. In 1999, Scott Wilson and his wife Jennifer James-Wilson acquired full ownership of the Leader and Garred retired. In 2016, the Wilsons sold the Leader to brothers Lloyd Mullen and J. Louis Mullen.
