= Simeon R. Wilson =

American politician and newspaper editor

Member of the Washington House of Representatives from the 10th district
- In office 1973–1993

Personal details
- Born: August 2, 1927 (age 98) Hood River, Oregon
- Died: February 8, 2009 (aged 81) Bremerton, Washington
- Party: Republican

Simeon Robert "Sim" Wilson III (August 2, 1927 – February 8, 2009) was an American politician and newspaper editor.

Born in Hood River, Oregon, Wilson served in the United States Navy during the Korean War. He received his bachelor's and master's degrees from University of Washington and went to Ohio State University. Wilson was a newspaper editor in Marysville, Washington, who owned the Marysville Globe and The Arlington Times. He served in the Washington House of Representatives as a Republican from 1973 to 1993. He died in Bremerton, Washington.
