= Olympia Pioneer and Democrat =

The Olympia Columbian, later known as the Washington Pioneer and the Pioneer and Democrat, was the first newspaper in what is now the U.S. state of Washington, and the seventh in the Oregon Territory. Its first issue was printed in 1852, and Olympia has had at least a weekly newspaper ever since. It continued under several name variants, going out of print as The Pacific Tribune in 1879.

== See also ==
- List of newspapers in Washington (state)
