= The Arlington Times =

- Type: Weekly newspaper
- Format: Broadsheet
- Owner: Sound Publishing
- Founded: 1888
- Ceased publication: 2020
- Language: English
- Headquarters: 1085 Cedar Avenue; Marysville, Washington
- Circulation: 5,475 (as of 2012)
- OCLC number: 939244058
- Website: arlingtontimes.com

The Arlington Times was a newspaper in Arlington, Washington, published weekly from 1888 to 2020. It was owned by Sound Publishing, who also operated the Marysville Globe and Everett Daily Herald.

== History ==
The Arlington Times began in 1888 as the Stillaguamish Times, published in Stanwood to the west of modern-day Arlington. Publisher George Morrill moved the printing plant to Haller City in 1890, becoming The Haller City Times, until moving into Arlington in 1894. It later absorbed the Haller City News, which had been published since 1879. On July 17, 1897, the newspaper was renamed to The Arlington Times.

On November 7, 1918, The Times published an erroneous dispatch from the United Press Association announcing that the ongoing war had ceased and an armistice was to be signed later in the day. The dispatch was actually reporting on a temporary ceasefire while German delegates arrived in Paris to negotiate an armistice, which was reached five days later. The article triggered celebrations in the city, including the hoisting of a wooden coffin for Kaiser Wilhelm II, and continued into the night despite the dispatch being rescinded. A celebration was also held for the actual armistice days later with 3,000 residents and visitors who doubled the city's population.

The newspaper was owned by the Marsh family until 1964, when it was sold to future state representative Simeon R. Wilson, owner and publisher of the Marysville Globe. Wilson sold The Times and Globe to Sun News in 1997. Sound Publishing acquired both newspapers from Sun News in 2007. Sound Publishing suspended printing of several newspapers, including the Globe and Times, in March 2020 due to the economic effects of the COVID-19 pandemic. By April, furloughs and layoffs at Sound Publishing left both newspapers without any staff. There are no plans to resume publication of either the Times or the Globe as of 2025.
