= Statesman-Examiner =

- Type: Weekly newspaper
- Owner(s): Gabriel Cruden
- Founder(s): Emmett Clark
- Founded: 1890 (as Colville Republican)
- Language: English
- Headquarters: 220 South Main Street; Colville, WA 99114
- Circulation: 4,365 (as of 2022)
- Sister newspapers: Deer Park Tribune
- OCLC number: 17365635
- Website: statesmanexaminer.com

The Statesman-Examiner is a weekly newspaper based in Colville, Washington. The paper is distributed every Wednesday.

== History ==
In August 1890, Emmett Clark, of Portland, founded the Colville Republican in Stevens County, Washington. By November 1891, the paper's editor and publisher was E. L. Jamieson. In February 1893, Jamieson sold the Colville Republican to J. H. Young, who switched party affiliations. By November that year, the paper was renamed to the Colville Index. In February 1895, John Jay Graves, formerly of the Waterville Index, bought the Colville Index from Young. In April 1896, John L. Metcalfe purchased the Colville Index from Graves. The paper then changed from a Democratic free silver advocate to an organ of the People's Party.

In February 1896, William D. Allen started the Springdale Statesman in Springdale. A notice in the first issue read "There is no politics in the establishment of the Statesman, and the perpetuation of the Standard, still when the time comes, we may fairly be expected to have opinions and the courage to express them." That fall Allen moved from Springdale to Colville to operate the Colville Index for owner Metcalfe. In September 1896, Allen purchased the Index and merged it with his Statesman to form the Statesman Index. Allen sold the paper in 1906. On October 31, 1907, the Colville Examiner was first published by J. C. Harrington. It was launched as a Democratic paper.

A.M. Dotty became the controlling owner of the Statesman Index in 1913. Around 1927, Dotty sold his controlling interests to H. E. Vilwock and E. A. Sperry became a minority-owner. In 1929, Sperry became the paper's sole-owner. In 1932, J. J. Collins bought the Statesman Index from Sperry through foreclosure. In November 1937, Collins sold the Statesman Index to W. H. Hoeft and Ray L. Price. Hoeft worked as editor and Price was the business manager. In August 1942, Hoeft enlisted in the United States Coast Guard and sold his stake to W. B. Scott, formerly associated with the Bonners Ferry Herald.

In February 1947, Harrington sold the Examiner to Charles T. Graham and M. A. Rodman, who soon sold out to Graham. In May 1948, Scott sold his interests in the Statesman Index to co-owner Price and Examiner publisher Charles T. Graham. At that time the Statesman-Index and the Colville Examiner were merged to form the Statesman-Examiner with a 4,000 circulation. In April 1955, Graham bought out Price. He continued to publish the paper until his death in 1983. His son Patrick J. Graham published the Statesman-Examiner until selling it in 1992, along with the Deer Park Tribune, to American Publishing Company. Both papers were acquired in 2000 from the company, renamed Hollinger Inc., by Horizon Publications. In 2024, the Statesman Index, Deer Park Tribune and The Sun were sold to Gabriel Cruden.
