= Deer Park Tribune =

- Type: Weekly newspaper
- Owner: Gabriel Cruden
- Founder: F. T. Sheppard
- Founded: 1906
- Language: English
- City: Deer Park
- Circulation: 12,004 (as of 2022)
- Sister newspapers: Statesman-Examiner
- Website: statesmanexaminer.com/dptribune

The Deer Park Tribune is the newspaper of record for the city of Deer Park in the U.S. state of Washington, founded in 1906. It previously known as the Deer Park Union and Tri-County Tribune.

== History ==
The Deer Park Union was founded in 1906 by F. T. Sheppard. Some time later he sold it to W. D. Philips, who then took in A. M. Wood as a partner. Philips retired and sold his shares to Wood in 1908. Wood soon leased the Union to Allen Haynes, who put Dwight G. Stratton in charge. In 1910, Wood, who later served as Deer Park mayor, sold the paper to A. T. Brownlow. J. Harry Johnson edited the paper from 1911 until his health failed in 1917. Carl S. Evans bought the paper in 1917. The paper was then purchased by W. W. Gilles in 1919, G. H. Rice in 1923 and Karel Wegkamp in 1938.

George Miles leased the paper in 1942 and then purchased it in December 1943. Charles J. Neugebauer leased the paper in 1952. In February 1953, Neugebauer, publisher of the Spokane County News, bought the Deer Park Union from Mrs. Cora Rice and merged the two papers together. The combined Union-News was to be renamed in March by readers through a contest. The News had been published since 1919 and Neugebauer bought it in September 1949. Neugebauer sold the recently formed Tri-County Tribune in November 1953 to William E. Cox, who ran the paper for almost two decades until selling out to in 1971 to Larry G. Bell.

In October 1984, Peter Chapin purchased the paper. He sold it in 1989 to Patrick J. Graham, owner of the Statesman-Examiner. At the time the Tribune was distributed for free to 7,000 households. In 1992, Graham sold the Statesman-Examiner and Deer Park Tribune to American Publishing Company. Both papers were acquired in 2000 from the company, renamed Hollinger Inc., by Horizon Publications. In 2024, the Statesman Index, Deer Park Tribune and The Sun were sold to Gabriel Cruden.
