= Shelton-Mason County Journal =

Weekly newspaper

- Type: Weekly newspaper
- Owner(s): Tom Mullen
- Founder(s): Grant C. Angle
- Publisher: John Lester
- Editor: Justin Johnson
- Founded: 1886
- Language: English
- Headquarters: 227 West Cota Street; Shelton, WA 98584
- OCLC number: 17319687
- Website: masoncounty.com

The Shelton-Mason County Journal is a weekly newspaper serving Shelton and Mason County, Washington.

== History ==
The newspaper was first published on December 31, 1886, by Grant Colfax Angle. He was 18 years old at the time, making him the youngest newspaper editor in Washington's history. The paper had more than 300 subscribers within the first year of publication. Initially named the Mason County Journal, the publication later changed its name to the Shelton-Mason County Journal on March 8, 1927.

In 1935, United States Marshal A. J. Chitty sold the Shelton Independent to Angle. Chitty had founded the paper in 1927 and sold it for $11,500. Two years later Angle sold both papers to Thomas F. Crocker, formerly of the Ames Daily Tribune. Angle, age 69, had run the Journal as both editor and publisher more than 50 years. At that time he was believed to have been the only person in the nation to have continuously worked at the same paper for that length of time.

Angle's son J. Eber Angle soon bought back the paper and he continued to edit it while the paper remained under the family's ownership. In 1945, J. Eber Angle sold the paper to Wilford "Wiff" L. Jessup, whose family had run the Daily News-Search in Bremerton. He planned to restore the Journal to a twice-a-week publication. Angle died in 1951 and two years later the Grant C. Angle School was named in his honor.

Other people bought interests in the paper over the years and the group sold it in 1966 to Henry Gay. Gay won national awards for his weekly columns on politics and world events. He once printed the entire text of a state pornography law, including dirty words, and the bill was laughed out the Legislature. He died in 1999. The Gay family operated the Journal until selling it in 2008. The new owner was Tom and Annie Mullen.

== Controversy ==
In 1992, the Journal garnered controversy for its policy of naming juveniles in sex-crime cases. Early that year the state house and state senate passed HB2348, which would fine anyone $500 for publicly releasing the names of juvenile victims of sexual crimes, excluding the parents. The Journal was thought to be the only paper in Washington to consistently name both witnesses and victims in all of its court reporting, along with sharing details of the crime. One paper suggested calling the measure "the Mason County newspaper bill" as the law was seen aimed squarely at the Journal. Managing editor Charles Gay defended the practice of naming juvenile sexual assault victims, arguing "it's the only fair way to cover a trail." Detractors called the Journal "a newspaper without pity."
