= Methow Valley News =

- Type: Weekly newspaper
- Owner: Don Nelson
- Founder: Harry E. Marble
- Founded: 1903; 123 years ago
- Language: English
- Headquarters: 502 S. Glover Street, Twisp, WA 98856
- Circulation: 3,035 (as of 2022)
- OCLC number: 17320091
- Website: methowvalleynews.com

The Methow Valley News is a weekly newspaper in Twisp, Washington, United States. As of 2021, it publishes weekly on Wednesdays and has a circulation of about 3,400.

== History ==
On July 3, 1903, Harry E. Marble published the first edition of the Methow Valley News in Twisp, Washington. Marble ran the paper for over four decades. It was acquired by Claude W. Watkins in 1945, followed by John Greene in 1956.

Watkins resumed ownership at some point and in 1960 sold it again to Dennis W. Lince. In 1961, Watkins died. Other owners of the paper were Jack Stoner and Dexter Jones. Don Nelson purchased the News on July 4, 2011. Nelson announced in 2025 his plans to retire and sell the paper.

== Awards ==
The Methow Valley News staff received 41 awards at the 2019 Washington Newspaper Publishers Association Better Newspaper Contest.
