= Islands' Sounder =

Newspaper published in Eastsound

- Type: Weekly newspaper
- Format: Broadsheet
- Owner: Sound Publishing
- Founder(s): Al and Nickee Magnuson
- Publisher: Colleen Smith
- Staff writers: Diane Craig
- Founded: 1964
- Language: English
- Circulation: 1,170 (as of 2023)
- Sister newspapers: Journal of the San Juan Islands
- Website: islandssounder.com

The Islands' Sounder is a newspaper published in Eastsound in the U.S. state of Washington. It was founded as The Orcas Sounder in 1964 by Al and Nickee Magnuson. It was expanded from 15 issues per year to a weekly publishing schedule, and its name was changed to encompass the entire San Juan Islands archipelago. The editor is Colleen Smith Armstrong.

When founded by Al and Nickee Magnuson in 1964, the Sounder was the first competition for the Friday Harbor Journal since the San Juan Islander's demise in 1914.

== History ==
In the summer of 1964, husband and wife Al and Nickee Magnuson attended a conference for travel writers in Bellingham, Washington. At the time the couple published the Birth Bay Booster. At the event, members of the Orcas Island Chamber of Commerce invited them to launch a similar paper in their town. That December, the first issue of the Orcas Sounder was published. The paper was originally printed monthly, expect for twice monthly in June, July and August.

In 1967, the paper's name was changed to the Orcas Island Booster to tie in more closely with the Magnuson's other two papers: the Birch Bay Booster and The Mount Baker Booster. In 1974, the name was changed again to the Islands' Sounder. In November 1985, the paper was sold to Ted and Kay Grossman. In 1994, the business merged with Whidbey Press., Inc., which at the time published the Whidbey News-Times and South Whidbey Record. Later that year the company was renamed to Sound Publishing. In 2024, Black Press, which owns Sound Publishing, was sold to Carpenter Media Group.
