= The Columbian =

Newspaper published in Washington, US

- Type: Daily newspaper
- Format: Broadsheet
- Owner: Columbian Publishing Co. (Campbell family)
- Founder: Tom Carolan
- Publisher: Ben Campbell
- Editor: Craig Brown
- Founded: 1890
- Language: English
- Headquarters: Vancouver, Washington
- Circulation: 48,078 (as of 2022)
- Sister newspapers: Camas-Washougal Post-Record
- ISSN: 1043-4151
- OCLC number: 15644994
- Website: columbian.com

The Columbian is a daily newspaper serving the Vancouver, Washington, and Clark County, Washington, area. It is owned by the Campbell family and is the newspaper of record for Vancouver and Washougal.

== History ==
Tom Carolan first published the Vancouver Columbian on October 10, 1890. He started the paper with S. D. Dennis as a means to promote the Democratic Party and act as counterweight to the local Republican newspaper The Vancouver Independent. Dennis left the paper in 1896 and was replaced by Joseph A. C. Brant. Republican Samuel J. Miller took the reins in 1900. Less than a year later the paper was turned over to M. M. Banister. Five years later he sold out to E. E. Beard, publisher of The Olympian.

Under Beard, the paper went from weekly to daily print publication on October 19, 1908. After twelve years Beard sold the paper to George Hyland, who sold out after six months to William H. Hornibrook in April 1919. Hornibrook sold the paper to Herbert Campbell, with the ownership change going into effect on May 1, 1921.

In 1928, the newspaper moved from the Odd Fellows' building at 4th and Washington streets into a newly constructed office building at the northwest corner of 10th and Broadway made specifically for the paper. The construction costs was $40,000. One person remarked the property looked like a bank.

In August 1947, rival newspaper Vancouver Daily Sun shuttered after publishing for four decades and its subscriber list and advertising accounts were taken over by the Vancouver Columbian. In 1954, construction on a new printing plant for the paper costing $375,000 began at West 8th and Grant street. The project was scheduled to be completed in July 1955. The Columbian published its first Sunday edition on Aug. 6, 1972, and added a Saturday edition on July 10, 1999.

The paper briefly relocated to new offices just south of Esther Short Park on Jan. 13, 2008, but, citing declining revenue, relocated to their original building at 701 W. 8th St. by December of the same year in an attempt to avert bankruptcy. On May 1, 2009, The Columbian filed for Chapter 11 bankruptcy protection. On Feb. 5, 2010, the company emerged from bankruptcy. On June 10, 2010, the city of Vancouver purchased the former Columbian building and surrounding land downtown for $18.5 million from the Bank of America to become its new city hall.

Ben Campbell, the paper's fourth generation owner, was named publisher in 2020.
