= Grandview Herald =

The Grandview Herald
- Type: Weekly newspaper
- Founded: 1909
- Language: English
- Headquarters: 308 Division St., Grandview, WA
- Circulation: 1,500 (as of 2022)
- Sister newspapers: Prosser Record-Bulletin
- OCLC number: 17410348
- Website: thegrandviewherald.com

The Grandview Herald is a weekly newspaper that covers the Grandview area and nearby communities in Yakima County in the U.S. state of Washington. It covers local news, sports, business, and community events to its audience every Wednesday. It is the official newspaper of record for the City of Grandview.

== History ==
The Herald, which used to be called the Grandview Newspaper, was founded on March 4, 1909 when S.J. Starr issued the first print. Two years after the paper starting circulation, it was purchased by Chapin D. Foster.

One year later, on January 2, 1912, the offices and printing shop burned down losing the first three years' worth of publications in the fire. The production of the paper continued, but the Herald didn’t get a new home until 1922 when the building that it currently resides in was built. Foster was the publisher from 1911 to 1924 and renamed the paper the Grandview Herald during that time.

Tullius J. Brown purchased the Grandview Herald in December 1924, and later the newspaper was purchased by Valley Publishing Company. In 1970, Rich Gay, owner of the Prosser Record-Bulletin, purchased the Grandview Herald. He then sold both his papers in 1986 to John L. Fournier Jr. He died in 2012. His daughter Danielle Fournier then took over as publisher.

== Recognition ==
In his 1919 history report, William Denison Lyman wrote that the Herald was a “bright, active, well-conducted” paper, which is a standard the newspaper strives to reach every week.
