= Journal of the San Juan Islands =

Newspaper in Friday Harbor, Washington

- Front page of the Journal for July 10, 2013
- Type: Weekly newspaper
- Owner: Sound Publishing
- Founder(s): Oscar G. Wall; Gus A. Ludwig
- Publisher: Colleen Smith
- Staff writers: Diane Craig
- Founded: 1906
- Language: English
- Circulation: 2,063 (as of 2023)
- Sister newspapers: Islands' Sounder
- ISSN: 0734-3809
- OCLC number: 8582787
- Website: sanjuanjournal.com

The Journal of the San Juan Islands is a newspaper based in Friday Harbor, Washington. The Journal publishes on Wednesdays. It also publishes SanJuanJournal.com; Springtide, an annual magazine for visitors; The Book of the San Juan Islands, an annual almanac; and special sections related to aspects of island life.

As of 2013, the economy of the San Juans is almost entirely driven by tourism, which has been described as a "thin base for newspaper endeavors."

== History ==
The first edition of the Friday Harbor Journal was published on Sept. 13, 1906. The paper's first editorial read: "Not unmindful of the cares and responsibilities of newspaper life, the JOURNAL makes its bow to the public today, inspired with hope that it may be useful in the development of this beautiful island county."

The paper was co-founded by Oscar Garrett Wall, an American Civil War veteran who had served in the 5th Minnesota Infantry Regiment. He fought in the Battle of Fort Ridgely and wrote a book titled "History of the Sioux Massacre." The paper's other co-founder was Gus A. Ludwig, a journeyman printer from Minneapolis. Its motto in the early days was "A Square Deal for Everybody."

Wall, age 62, moved to the San Juan Islands because his health was failing. After eight months, he sold his interest in the Journal on June 3, 1907 to 24-year-old Virgil Frits. Frits was a cigar-smoking Republican who got his start in the news business at The Reveille in Bellingham. He formed a partnership with Ludwig and they operated the Journal together.

In 1914, a competing newspaper, the San Juan Islander, ceased operations. In 1915, the Journal got its first typesetting machine. In 1919, Frits was sued for libel for an editorial he penned calling for all members of the Industrial Workers of the World to be arrested for the Centralia Tragedy. A jury acquitted Frits.

Ludwig operated the Journal for nearly 20 years, until his death in 1932. Frits ran the paper for a total of 51 years with his wife Maude. The couple sold the Journal in 1958 to Robert Hartzog and his wife Mildred. Hartzog was a former radio control room operator at KOIN. Under him, the Journal obtained a more modern press for commercial printing and equipment to reproduce photos in the paper. Hartzog owned the paper until his death 11 years later. The paper was then purchased by Lyman "Tommy" and Jean Thomas, along with Sam Buck.

The Thomases managed the day-to-day business and under them the Journal transitioned from a county paper to a Community newspaper. In summer 1975, the couple sold their stake to Art Taylor. The owners then hired Jim Lehde to operate the Journal, who converted the paper from broadsheet to tabloid. Over a year later he was succeeded by Jerry Worthen.

Larry and Rosalind Duthie acquired the paper in April 1978 and expanded circulation from 2,800 to 4,500. The paper's name was changed to the Journal of the San Juan Islands in 1981. The Journal was bought by Frank Leeming in 1983, Philip Ballard and John McKenna in 1992, and Hollinger Inc. in 1997.

On Oct. 2, 1998, The Journal launched its online news site, SanJuanJournal.com. Effective March 31, 2000, the paper was owned by Horizon Publications. A competitor, the San Juan Islander, launched as a news website in 2000 and adopted the name of the former newspaper that published from 1891 to 1914. The online news site was founded by two former Journal employees, Sharon Kivisto and Matt Pranger.

In 2000, The Journal — which was locally published and locally managed — was a pawn in a fraud involving its owner. At that time, The Journal was part of Lower Mainland Publishing Co., a subsidiary of Hollinger International, which Conrad Black and his associate David Radler controlled. Black and Radler arranged for Hollinger to sell The Journal and the Skagit Valley Argus, on May 1, 2000, to Horizon Publications, a company which they secretly owned, for the sum of $1. Horizon sold The Journal the following year to Black Press (an unrelated firm) for $280,000. The directors of Hollinger were not informed of a previous third-party offer of $750,000 for The Journal alone. Ever since the sale, The Journal has been operated by Sound Publishing, Inc., a division of Black Press. The company was acquired by Carpenter Media Group in 2024.

== Notable columnists ==
- Virgil and Maude Frits, "Friday Harbor in a Nutshell": a column about local happenings, and comings and goings.
- Tony Surina, "A Look Back — From the Pages of The Journal": news items from 50 and 90 years earlier, culled from The Journal's archived editions.
- Howard Schonberger, "Ferry Home Companion": local slice-of-life column.

== Extra editions ==
During the 2000s, The Journal — which is normally printed on the mainland — produced several extra editions that were printed as its office and distributed for free. Several election-night extras were produced, along with extras for major events such as a downtown Friday Harbor fire on May 9, 2002. The Journal also produced The Daily Fair, a free, four-page newspaper, during the San Juan County Fair; The Journal's booth at the fairgrounds served as a news bureau during the countywide fair.

== Books by former Journal employees ==
- "Gunkholing in the Gulf Islands," by Jo Bailey, co-author (1986, Robert Hale & Co.).
- "Gunkholing in Desolation Sound and Princess Louisa," by Jo Bailey, co-author (1989, Robert Hale & Co.).
- "Gunkholing in South Puget Sound," by Jo Bailey, co-author (1997, San Juan Enterprises).
- "Gunkholing in the San Juan Islands," by Jo Bailey, co-author (2000, San Juan Enterprises).
- "Mahini Tiare, Pacific Passages," by Barbara Marrett, co-author (1993, Pacific International Publishing).
- "Roche Harbor," by Richard Walker (2009, Arcadia Publishing).
- "The Journey Home," by Richard Walker (2012, Red Bird Chapbooks).
- "Indian Country Stylebook for Editors, Writers and Journalists," by Richard Walker, co-author (2016, Kitsap Publishing).
- "Paxton the Sheepdog Who Couldn't ...", by Jane K. Fox (2017, Waterstones).
- "Point No Point," by Richard Walker (2019, Arcadia Publishing).
- "Frybread Dreams & Other Poems," by Richard Arlin Walker (2020, Deer Dancer Press).
- "Return to Saigon: A Memoir," by Larry Duthie (2020, Kindle Direct Publishing).
