= Prosser Record-Bulletin =

- Type: Weekly newspaper
- Founder(s): Nellie M. Eldredge; J. M. Parker
- Founded: 1893
- Language: English
- City: Prosser, Washington
- Circulation: 2,809 (as of 2022)
- Sister newspapers: Grandview Herald
- OCLC number: 16991498
- Website: theprosserrecordbulletin.com

The Prosser Record-Bulletin is a newspaper serving Prosser, Washington and the surrounding area (including Benton City, Washington and Whitstran, Washington).

== History ==
The first newspaper published in Benton County, Washington was the Prosser Falls American. It was established in October 1893 by Mrs. Nellie M. Eldredge and J. M. Parker, formerly of the Orting Oracle. They published their first issue in January 1894. That October, Captain Fred R. Reed succeeded Eldredge as editor and manager. By May 1985, the editor was W. H. James. That October, James surrendered his lease to F. W Roach, who was employed by the Yakima Herald. James was noted for making the American a financial success. The paper soon encountered hard times, moved its plant to Yakima and fell into the hands of mortgagees Seymour, Barto & Co. Roach transferred his lease to D. D. Calkins and W. B. Noble in November 1896. Around that time the plant came under the ownership of Mr. Cameron of the Pasco News who moved it to Trail Creek country.

On December 29, 1893, A. W. Maxwell established The Record in Prosser. He sold out after a year to August and Brownlow. Around 1900 George E. Boomer took over as owner. On June 26, 1902, H. G. Guild established the Prosser Falls Bulletin. The paper was later acquired by A. E. Verity, after which the name was changed to the Prosser Bulletin. The Republican was established in 1906 and merged with the Bulletin to form the Republican Bulletin in 1907. In 1910, the paper was leased to and later purchased by W. R. Sproull.

In November 1909, The Benton Independent was founded by H. A. Wells and L. L. Lynn. The venture was not too successful. On May 13, 1913, the Independent was consolidated into the Record under Carl B. Michener, who recently bought the paper from G. A Haynes. The name was then changed to the Independent Record and C. E. Rusk was made editor. The paper was sold in 1915 by the sheriff for $4,300 to satisfy mortgage held by the Prosser State Bank. It ceased a year later and its printing plant was purchased by Sproull, owner of the Republican Bulletin. In June 1920, the Independent Record and the Republican Bulletin merged to form the Prosser Record-Bulletin.

In 1928, Robert E. Gay bought the Record Bulletin. He died in 1949 and the paper was passed down to his son, Rich Gay. In 1970, Gay purchased the Grandview Herald. He then sold both his papers in 1986 to John L. Fournier Jr. He died in 2012. His daughter Danielle Fournier then took over as publisher.
