= Tri-City Herald =

Twice-weekly newspaper published in Kennewick, Washington

Coordinates: 46°12′36.42″N 119°7′24.64″W

- The August 13, 2007, front page of the Tri-City Herald
- Type: Twice-weekly newspaper
- Format: Broadsheet
- Owner: The McClatchy Company
- Founder: Elwyn P. Greene
- Editor: Laurie Williams
- Founded: 1903 (as the Pasco Express)
- Language: English
- Headquarters: 4253 W 24th Ave #120; Kennewick, Washington, U.S. 99338
- Circulation: 16,776 Daily; 18,715 Sunday (as of 2020)
- OCLC number: 17157840
- Website: tri-cityherald.com

The Tri-City Herald is a twice-weekly newspaper based in Kennewick, Washington, United States. Owned by The McClatchy Company, the newspaper serves southeastern Washington state, including the three cities of Kennewick, Pasco and Richland (which are collectively known as the Tri-Cities).

== History ==
In August 1903, Elwyn P. Greene founded the Pasco Express. Greene previously was a pastor in Walla Walla and had established the Kennewick Courier. In June 1905, he sold the paper to Charles T. Giezentanner. In December 1910, E.J. Jones and Lee C. Henderson bought the Express from Giezentanner. In February 1912, the Express was made the Official newspaper of record for the city of Pasco.

Jones left at some point and Henderson withdrew from the paper in September 1913, leaving it to W.C. Sallee. In April 1914, Sallee left the Express due to failing health, and died two months later. Sallee had leased the paper and Henderson assumed editorial control in his absence.

W.Y. Sanborn and P.A. Roberts leased the paper in May 1914. A year later the two left and W.W. Quinian assumed control. In June 1915, he bought the Pasco Progress and absorbed it into the Express. In January 1918, C.F. Lake left the paper.

In April 1918, Charles A. Sprague and O.H. Olson bought the Express from Quinian. They then renamed it to the Pasco Herald. In June 1923, Hill Williams bought out Sprague. In January 1943, he bought out Olson and acquired full ownership. In June 1946, Bill Wilmot, who previously owned the Ritzville Journal-Times, purchased the Herald from Williams.

In May 1947, the Herald obtained associate membership in the Associated Press. That September, Wilmot sold the paper to a corporation headed by Hugh A. Scott, who was associated with Glenn C. Lee and Robert F. Philips. A month later the Herald was expanded to a daily and renamed to the Tri-City Herald. In 1950, striking workers of the Herald launched a morning competitor in Pasco called the Columbia Basin News,. The Tri-Cities then became one of the smallest U.S. markets with two competing daily newspapers until the News printed its last issue in 1963.

Scott Publishing sold the paper to McClatchy in 1979. After over 30 years as an afternoon paper, it became a morning paper in 1984. It added a Saturday edition in 1987. The Herald switched from carrier to postal delivery in December 2022. At that time an expanded Sunday edition was moved to a Saturday delivery. A year later the paper deceased its print editions to twice weekly on Wednesdays and Saturdays
