= The Reflector (Washington newspaper) =

Newspaper published in Battle Ground, Washington

- Type: Weekly newspaper
- Owner(s): Camden and Mac Spiller
- Founder: Kelley Loe
- Editor-in-chief: Eric Schwartz
- Founded: 1909; 117 years ago
- Headquarters: 209 E Main St, Ste 139 Battle Ground, WA 98604
- Circulation: 29,022 (as of 2022)
- OCLC number: 17011335
- Website: thereflector.com

The Reflector is a weekly newspaper that provides coverage of Battle Ground, Washington in the United States and is the legal newspaper of the City of Battle Ground.

The name Reflector comes from a tradition including similar newspaper titles like "Mirror." Norwalk, Ohio and Greenville, North Carolina also have newspapers called the Reflector.

== History ==
Kelley Loe published the first issue of The Reflector in Ridgefield, Washington on October 8, 1909. At the time the town had a population around 300. In March 1910, Loe denied reports he had sold the paper, but the later that month it was confirmed the new owner was to be H. A. Moore.

A. W. and C. C. McCormack owned the paper for three years until they sold the paper to Willard D. Nelson, of Haines. The paper was soon returned to the McCormacks who resold it in 1924 to J.R. "Red" Hicks, of Sumas. A year later he installed a linotype machine. Hicks published the paper for 22 years, only ever taking 11 vacation days during his career. The Reflector was sold to a group of six Vancouver businessmen who incorporated the enterprise as the A. M. Publishing Company Dave H. Deihl. The company also published the Mid-County Record of Battle Ground, and soon relocated the printing plant.

Richard F. Crouch was hired as a foreman at the Ridgefield newspaper plant and Battle Ground commercial printing plant. In 1948, Crouch and Robert L. Robb leased the plant from A.M., and Crouch later bought Robb out to become the sole owner of The Reflector and The Mid-County Record. By 1951, the papers came to be owned by John Holt Dodge, who merged the two papers together form The Mid-County Reflector. The paper was relocated from Ridgefield to Battle Ground in 1959.

In 2010, The Reflector was purchased by Lafromboise Communications from its owner of the previous 30 years, Marvin Case. At that time, it had a free home delivery circulation of 26,500. Steve Walker, formerly of The Daily Chronicle, took over as publisher. In 2020, Chad and Coralee Taylor, owners of The Silver Agency in Chehalis, purchased the newspaper from Lafromboise Communications owner Jenifer Lafromboise Falcon.

In 2026, brothers Camden and Mac Spiller, owners of Maddox Industrial Transformer, bought The Reflector. At the time, the paper's six employees, including two reporters, were required by the new ownership to reapply for their jobs; the publication was also planned for a six-month hiatus. The purchase raised concerns among members in the community given the Spiller's association with members of Christian nationalist movements as well as perceived potential conflicts of interest with the brother's ownership of multiple businesses in Battle Ground, several of which employ other prominent figures and elected officials in the city. In a commentary article, Camden Spiller announced that new ownership would not allow "puff pieces or pulled punches" and any conflicts of interest was to be noted.
