= Columbia Basin News =

Newspaper in Pasco, Washington

- Type: Daily newspaper
- Founded: 1950
- Ceased publication: 1963
- Language: English
- City: Pasco, Washington
- OCLC number: 17164688

The Columbia Basin News was a morning daily newspaper published in Pasco, Washington in the United States from 1950 to 1963.

== History ==
The Columbia Basin News was founded in March 1950 with a circulation of 6,500.

A strike and subsequent lockout occurred at the Tri-City Herald in 1950. Employees of the Herald, an afternoon daily published in Kennewick, Washington, (across the river from Pasco) went on to help found the Columbia Basin News with the backing of the International Typographical Union, the same union whose members struck the Herald months before.

== Executives ==
The News' publisher was Howard Parrish, former publisher of The Seattle Star (1899–1947). Ted Van Arsdol edited the CBN in 1963, during its last struggle to survive. Elements of the struggle included use of the "Kiddie Corps"--journalism students from nearby Columbia Basin College, Pasco. These reporters included Larry Ashby (After college, worked for Tri-City Herald), Samuel Martinez, Rick Dykes, and Barbara Smith. Seasoned reporters who helped train the Kiddie Corps were Elroy King and Duane Mason. After the CBN's demise, regular staff hired on with other employers, while the "Kiddie Corps" continued their educations.
