= Camas-Washougal Post-Record =

Weekly newspaper published in Camas, Washington

- Type: Weekly newspaper
- Owner(s): Columbian Publishing Co. (Campbell family)
- Founder(s): Kelley Loe
- Managing editor: Kelly Moyer
- Founded: 1908
- Language: English
- Headquarters: 701 W. Eighth St., Vancouver, Washington
- Circulation: 10,000 (as of 2022)
- Sister newspapers: The Columbian
- OCLC number: 17023401
- Website: camaspostrecord.com

The Camas-Washougal Post-Record is a weekly newspaper in Camas, Washington.

== History ==
The LaCamas Post was first published by Kelley Loe on Jan. 25, 1908. Nine months later Loe announced the paper had been purchased by G. O. Mercer, a newspaper man from Ohio. The paper was soon renamed to the Camas Post. Mercer sold the Post in 1910 to E. V. Hartman. The paper was returned to Mercer who sold it again to Arthur A. Hay, who two years later sold it to George Washington Hopp.

In 1925, Elmer M. Armstrong, who edited the Washougal Record for the past five years, sold the Record to Upton H. Gibbs, who previously edited the Eastern Clackamas News in Estacada.

In 1928, Post editor Hopp died. John V. Lund succeeded him as editor and purchased the paper from his estate a few months later. In 1929, Gibbs sold the Record to Ray D. Fisher, of McMinnville.

In 1930, Lund purchased the Record from Fisher and merged the two together to form the Camas-Washougal Post-Record. The following owners were E. F. Glick (1942), L. M. Slinkard (1944), Clyde Brown and Leland R. Dowlin (1946), Hal and Judy Zimmerman (1957).

In 1980, Eagle Newspapers of Salem, Oregon, obtained ownership of the Post-Record through a merger. In 2004, the company sold the paper to The Columbian Publishing Co. In 2025, the paper's print edition was redesigned and the Post-Record's and The Columbian's newsrooms was merged together.
