= Leavenworth Echo =

Weekly newspaper in Leavenworth, Washington, U.S.

- Type: Weekly newspaper
- Format: Broadsheet
- Owner(s): Ward Media, LLC
- Founder: Deed H. Mayar
- Founded: 1904; 121 years ago
- Language: English
- Headquarters: Leavenworth, Washington
- Circulation: 1,600 (as of 2022)
- OCLC number: 16996294
- Website: leavenworthecho.com

The Leavenworth Echo is a weekly newspaper in Leavenworth, Washington, United States. Founded in 1904, it was sold to Ward Media LLC in August 2023.

== History ==
The Echo was founded by Deed H. Mayar and published its first edition on January 15, 1904. It was preceded by a now-defunct newspaper, the Journal, which began publication in 1898. The newspaper leaned Republican and was published from Mayar's home in a five-column format. Mayar was later elected as the first mayor of Leavenworth when the town was incorporated in 1906. The newspaper's editors during this period were Deed and his son Julian, who later enlisted in the U.S. Navy during World War I.

Mayar retired in 1919 and sold the newspaper to the Echo Publishing Company. In 1929, editor H. S. Rearick sold his interest in the business to W. G. Schannach. After more than two decades he sold the paper in 1952 to Russell Lee, who operated it for almost two decades until selling it to Earl Petersen in 1970. The Echo was owned by Miles and Jane Turnbull from 1976 to 1988. Prairie Media, Inc. owned the Echo by 1998. At that time the business was sold to Gaylen G. and Bruce R. Willett, publishers of the Entiat Valley Explorer. The sale also included the Cashmere Valley Record. NCW Media, Inc., owned by Bill and Carol Forhan, purchased the papers in 2000. The Echo and Record were sold in August 2023 to Ward Media, LLC.
