= The Everett Herald =

Daily newspaper published in Everett, Washington

- Type: Daily newspaper
- Format: Broadsheet
- Owner: Sound Publishing
- Founder(s): Sam A. Perkins; Samuel E. Wharton
- Publisher: Carrie Radcliff
- President: John Carr
- Editor: Michael Henneke
- Opinion editor: Jon Bauer
- Founded: 1901; 125 years ago
- Language: English
- Headquarters: 1800 41st St., Suite S-300; Everett, Washington, U.S.
- Circulation: 17,560 (Tuesday–Saturday) (as of 2023)
- ISSN: 2332-0079
- OCLC number: 304341898
- Website: heraldnet.com

The Everett Herald is a daily newspaper based in Everett, Washington, United States. It is owned by Sound Publishing, Inc. The paper serves residents of Snohomish County in the Seattle metropolitan area.

== History ==
On December 15, 1891, the first issue of The Everett Herald was published. It was backed by John E. McManus and other members of the Mitchell Land Co., and edited by James N. Bradley, managing editor of the Tacoma Globe. In May 1892, McManus disposed of his interests in The Herald to Bradley and Albert B. Bailey. The paper ceased publication during the Panic of 1893.

In January 1897, The Everett Herald, Everett Democrat, Snohomish Independent merged to form the Everett Independent under the ownership of J.W. Frame. By March 1898, it was owned and operated by W.E. Rothery. Major H.W. Patton purchased the paper from Rothery in April 1899. At that time the paper had a circulation of 300.

=== Sam Perkins (1901–1905) ===
Sydney "Sam" Albert Perkins, a proprietor of two Tacoma newspapers, purchased the Independent in January 1901 and renamed to The Everett Herald. The first issue of the newly christened paper published on February 11, 1901 with Samuel E. Wharton serving as its editor. A 1908 book covering the history of Snohomish County lists both Perkins and Wharton as the newspaper's founders.

On March 14, 1903, The Everett Herald Company purchased a double corner lot on Colby Avenue and Wall Street for construction of a three-story brick building, which would make it the only paper in the Puget Sound to own the building it occupies. Once complete, the site would house The Herald's newspaper plant equipped with new machinery including a linotype machine from a New York factory, a double-feed Dispatch press and a Whitlock cylinder press. The Herald was to be enlarged to an eight-page seven-column paper, the same size as newspapers in Seattle and Tacoma.

=== The Best Family (1905–1978) ===
Perkins sold the paper to James B. Best, of Everett, and his newly established enterprise, The Daily Herald Company, on September 6, 1905. The price paid for both the building and business was $100,000. At the time the paper's circulation was 4,250. After the sale, the paper continued to be a member of the Perkins Press news syndicate in the years to follow.

James B. Best's wife Gertrude Best took over for him when he died in 1922 at the age of 56. By 1926, the paper's circulation was 15,000. Gertrude oversaw The Herald for the next 17 years. She established the paper's photo department and published its first Sunday edition, which was scrapped in 1932 as a result of The Great Depression.

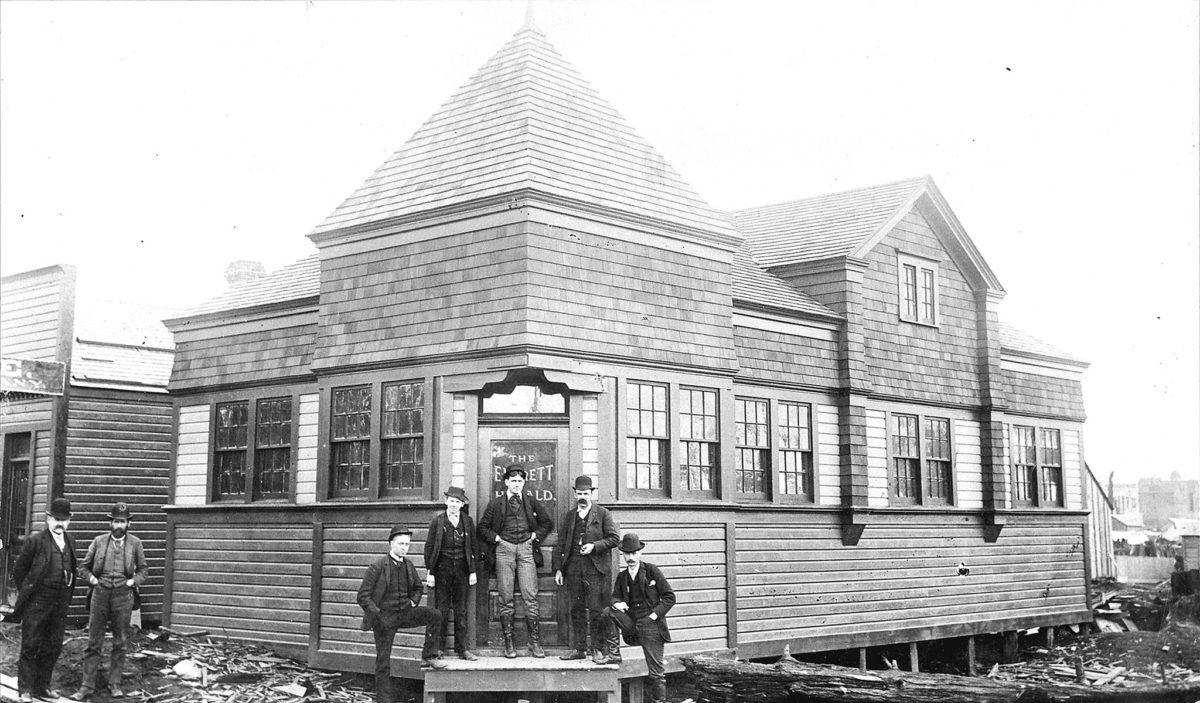
The Everett Herald newspaper office at California and Chestnut Street in Everett, Washington on April 11, 1892.

The Bests' son assumed the role of publisher when his mother suffered a stroke in 1939. She later died in 1947. Robert D. Best Sr. became publisher at 29 and served in that role for 37 years until dying from a stroke in 1976. He was succeeded by his son, Robert D. Best Jr.

The newspaper established a satellite news bureau for southern Snohomish County in May 1954, which later became the Western Sun edition in 1970.

A three-alarm fire occurred February 13, 1956, at the paper's building on Colby and Wall Streets. The explosive blaze began in the basement when a backfiring furnace ignited a pan of oil underneath the $150,000 rotary press. Extensive damage occurred throughout the building. Only the business offices escaped the flames, but were damaged by water and smoke. It took two-hours to extinguish the fire. Three firefighters were injured, but none of the 140 newspaper employees were hurt.

An editor said six employees were working in the building when the fire started at 8:53 p.m., but all escaped unharmed. As the building burned, a veteran reporter gathered staff members to remove what office equipment they could from the building before the flames drove them back. Despite the blaze, the paper published the next day by using the facilities of The Seattle Times and Local 23 Photo Engravers Union.

In 1959, The Herald moved its offices and printing presses to a building on California Street.

=== The Washington Post (1978–2013) ===
The Best family owned the newspaper until selling it in 1978 to the Washington Post Company. Robert D. Best Jr. remained on as the newspaper's publisher and president. At the time, circulation was 56,200.

The purchase was part of the Post's strategy of acquiring smaller dailies near large cities, and then expanding into some of the big-city territory. The strategy largely failed, and decades later The Herald "remained the awkward survivor of a discarded business strategy," Crosscut.com reporter David Brewster wrote in 2013.

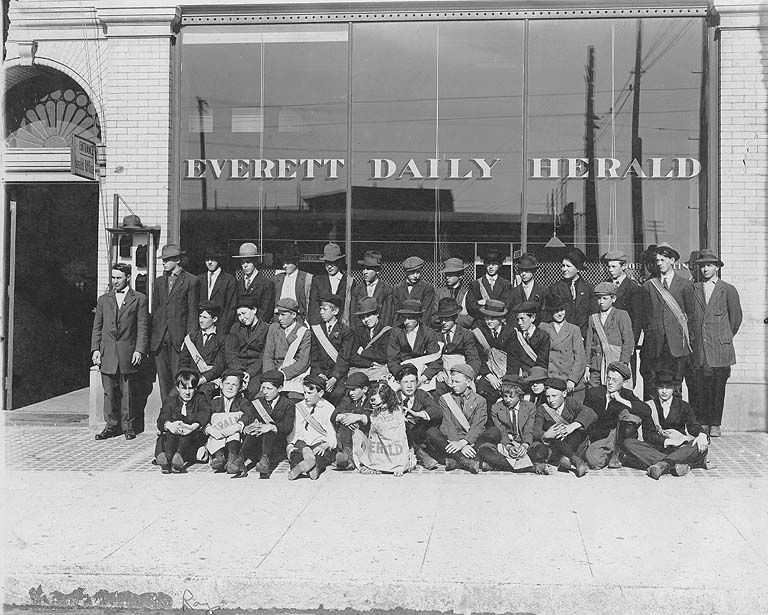
Newsboys for the Everett Daily Herald, c. 1929

On April 5, 1981, The Herald relaunched its Sunday edition and folded the Western Sun edition into the countywide newspaper.

The Herald was an afternoon paper until switching to a morning paper in 1991. The newspaper also acquired a chain of weekly newspapers under The Enterprise in southern Snohomish County, which it operated from 1996 to 2012.

The Daily Herald's website, HeraldNet.com, was launched on January 5, 1997.

The Herald Business Journal launched in April 1998 as monthly magazine covering business and technology. A website for that publication launched in April 2001. The magazine's name was changed to Snohomish County Business Journal in August 2002. The name changed back in 2012.

The Journal launched the same month as a competitor, Everett Business Journal, owned by Sun News Inc., which also published The Bellingham Business Journal and The Wenatchee Business Journal. In April 2004, Everett Business Journal ceased publication and its assets were acquired by The Herald's publisher. At that time, The Herald's business publication had a circulation of 16,000.

The Herald laid off 10 employees on August 19, 2008, due to the Great Recession. About 15 empty positions company-wide would also not be filled. No newsroom employees were laid off.

In January 2013, The Herald announced six employees would be laid off, including four from the newsroom, due to ad revenue loses. Two vacancies would also not be filled, and one news reporter's hours were reduced.

=== Sound Publishing (2013–present) ===
On February 6, 2013, the Washington Post Company announced it was selling the paper to the Sound Publishing division of Black Press, based in Victoria, British Columbia. At the time of purchase, The Herald had a 46,000 daily circulation and a 50,795 Sunday circulation while losing modest amounts of money in recent years. The newspaper then moved to Sound Publishing's offices on Colby Avenue in Everett. On November 6, 2013, the paper announced it would launch a paywall on its website with a limit of 15 free articles. Afterwards, readers would be prompted to subscribe for $8.95 per month.

Ten employees were laid off in February 2017, including four from the newsroom. In February 2019, it was reported The Herald had 200 or so coin-operated newspaper vending machines in operation and was planning to install newspaper racks topped with flat screen monitors at stores. An optical lens on top of the unit would be able to determine a person's age and gender within 15 feet and then play targeted ads along with sports scores, weather, news and a broadcast anchor. As of 2023, these racks have not been installed in stores. The newspaper's printing plant near Paine Field was replaced in 2022 by a new Sound Publishing plant in Lakewood. The plant includes a press acquired from The Gazette of Cedar Rapids, Iowa.

In April 2020, Sound Publishing laid off 20% of its workforce amid a decline in ad revenue resulting from the COVID-19 recession in the United States. Seventy workers across all departments lost their jobs, including more than a dozen employees who worked on The Herald. No news reporters were laid off, but newsroom employees had their hours reduced 20% to 40%.

In March 2020, The Herald launched the Investigative Journalism Fund in cooperation with the Community Foundation of Snohomish County. As of September that year, the paper had received donations amounting $125,000 to help support investigative journalism. In September 2020, The Herald launched the Environmental and Climate Change Reporting Fund in the same vain. The Health Reporting Initiative launched in October 2022 is funded in part for three years by Premera Blue Cross.

On July 19, 2022, editorial staff members at The Herald announced their intention to unionize, citing poor wages and an inability to retain staff as key concerns they wished to address. The Herald's newsroom employees voted unanimously on September 8 to unionize. On December 25, 2022, The Herald announced it would start using the U.S. Postal Service for same-day delivery. The paper also announced it would cease publishing a Sunday edition and that the Monday edition would be online only.

On June 19, 2024, the newspaper laid off 12 journalists—half of its editorial staff. An article on the layoffs posted to The Herald's website was taken down and replaced with version that appeared friendlier to owner Carpenter Media Group, which had acquired Sound Publishing earlier that year. A company executive called the original article a "hit-piece" while The Herald's editors threatened to quit if the story was not republished. On June 24, the paper's newsroom union went on strike for the day to protest layoffs. The union raised $13,353 on GoFundMe for its strike fund and Rick Larsen, who represents the Everett area in Congress, joined the striking workers Monday. The union alleged the company used a "quota system" based on story count and page views to determine who was going to be laid off and demanded all jobs to be reinstated. On June 25, the union extended the strike for a second day until Carpenter Media agreed to set a date to bargain over the job cuts. An agreement was eventually reached, and in the end, 12 union employees were laid off on Aug. 5 with some taking buyouts. The paper's publisher was also replaced in July.

In April 2025, the paper announced it would move its office to a small building on Hewitt Avenue in downtown Everett. In September 2025, Sound Publishing announced it would close its Lakewood printing press as it was losing $1 million a year. Printing of the Herald was moved to Mount Vernon. That same month, the paper's union ratified its first contract.

== Notable court cases ==
In March 1983, The Daily Herald lost an appellate court case in the State of Washington in which it sought to quash a subpoena allowing a judicial review of confidential material gathered for articles it had published in 1979 on the cult activities of Theodore Rinaldo, who had since been convicted on charges of rape, indecent liberties and assault. The New York Times reported that the court had ruled that "criminal defendants could force reporters to reveal confidential sources if the information was crucial to the case" and characterized the loss as "a major defeat for the news media". The Daily Herald took the Appeals Court decision to the Washington Supreme Court in State v. Rinaldo 102 Wn.2d 749 (1984), which was heard en banc with the result that the subpoena itself was quashed on the basis that Rinaldo had not met the threshold requirements to compel such an inspection, while upholding the Court of Appeals ruling in general.
