= Cashmere Valley Record =

Newspaper in Cashmere, Washington

- Type: Weekly newspaper
- Owner(s): Ward Media, LLC
- Editor: Gary Begin
- Founded: 1907
- Language: English
- City: Cashmere, Washington
- Circulation: 1,000 (as of 2022)
- ISSN: 2835-4494
- OCLC number: 16999566
- Website: cashmerevalleyrecord.com

The Cashmere Valley Record is a newspaper founded in 1907 that covers local news, sports, and obituaries surrounding the Cashmere, Washington region. It also covers news for Peshastin, Dryden, and Monitor.

== History ==
In November 1906, lawyer Arther H. Mohler moved to Cashmere from Minnesota. He was soon admitted to the Washington State Bar Association. At the time The Wenatchee Advance circulated a Cashmere edition, composed mostly of content about Wenatchee. Talk of starting a local paper came up a Cashmere Commercial Club and Mohler bluffed, offering to start a paper if the club agreed to buy $40 worth of ads a week for a whole year. His bluff was called, and Mohler launched the Cashmere Valley Record on February 8, 1907.

Mohler used a Washington hand press he bought from the editor of the Leavenworth Echo and other equipment previously used by the defunct The Cashmere Democrat. The first print run was 200 copies. At the time the editor of The Advance wrote the Record wouldn't last six months. But the paper survived an after two years Mohler sold it to his printer J. D. Corselius. He sold the paper around 1912 to I. T. Raab and repurchased it about a year later. In 1922, the paper was purchased by Henry Everett VanOmermen. Six years later the paper had 2,000 subscribers.

VanOmermen operated the Record for 26 years until selling in June 1948 to Vernon R. Frost, an associate professor of journalism at the University of Washington and former publisher of the Cheney Free Press. He made a deal with Donald Zylstra, a recent UW journalism graduate, for him to work as editor and co-publisher in exchange for slowly being sold the paper by Frost over a few years until one day becoming sole-owner. Zylstragrew frustrated with his inability to grow the paper and left in 1951, going on to a Nieman Fellowship at Harvard University. Frost worked with three other editors until selling the Record in January 1954. The new owners Orlo and Garnet Mohr operated the paper until 1962. Charlie and Dorothy Hears succeeded them. The purchased the Pilot Rock News in Oregon and sold the Record to Joe and Leslie Brown in September 1965.

In 1971, Earl Petersen, owner of the Leavenworth Echo, purchased the Record from Joe Brown. He sold both papers a year later to Kenneth Herr and Leslie Parr, joint publishers of the Grant County Journal in Ephrata. In August 1973, Charles "Chuck" and Hedy Hartnett bought the paper. In November 1978, Charles Hartnett sold the paper to Miles and Jane Turnbull. They sold the Record on July 22, 1979 to John and Gloria Reichmann. On July 19, 1984, the Reichmanns sold the paper to Mike and Donna Cassidy. The paper was purchased again in 1989 by Jim and Amy Davis. They were succeeded by Jeff and Liz Gauger in March 1995. Prairie Media, the paper's publisher, was sold in 1998 to Gaylen G. and Bruce R. Willett. In 2000, the papers were sold to NCW Media, Inc., owned by Bill and Carol Forhan. Two decades later NCW Media, Inc. sold its papers to Ward Media, LLC in August 2023. Six months later the paper launched a new website.
