= Forks Forum =

- Type: Weekly newspaper
- Format: Broadsheet
- Owner: Sound Publishing
- Founder: Benjamin Arndt
- Publisher: Eran Kennedy
- Editor: Christi Olson Baron
- Founded: 1931
- Language: English
- Circulation: 995 (as of 2023)
- Website: forksforum.com

The Forks Forum is a weekly newspaper published on Thursdays serving the city of Forks in the U.S. state of Washington. This newspaper was established in 1931 to serve Forks and the surrounding rural communities of the western Olympic Peninsula. The paper bills itself as the "Farthest west newspaper in the contiguous United States."

== History ==
The first issue of the Forks Forum was published on July 16, 1931. It was founded by Benjamin A. Arndt a former Port Angeles printer. The paper was a seven-column, four page weekly printed by hand. In his first editorial, Arndt wrote "We believe that Forks needs a local newspaper - that the people here want one. That fact that a good newspaper is an asset to any town has long since been proven."

In 1934, Arndt sold the paper to Elmer J. Beard, who added a new Intertype Corporation composing machine to the printing plant. At some point he sold it to Mrs. Mae Wenham. In 1940, she sold the paper to James Astel, a printer from Oak Harbor. He published the paper until his death in 1965 and his wife Marion Astel died a year later.

In 1968, Gordon Otos, president of the Forks Broadcasting Co. which operated the radio station KVAC, purchased the Form from Roy Black Jr. and Earlene Anderson. In 1971, Otos purchased the Peninsula Herald, a weekly paper published in Port Angeles since 1946.

At some point the two papers were merged and the name was changed to the Forks Forum-Peninsula Herald. Lorraine Maris became the owner in 1974, and sold the paper in 1990 to Frown Maloney, who also owned the Jimmy Come Lately Gazette in Sequim and the monthly Peninsula Business Journal. At the time the Forks paper had a 4,200 weekly circulation.

Sound Publishing, a division of Canada-based Black Press Group, purchased the Forks Forum and Sequim Gazelle in October 2011 from previous owners Olympic View Publishing Company, which had been owned and operated by Brown M. Maloney for over 23 years. In early 2020, the Forks Forum went entirely digital due to COVID-19 setbacks and returned in May 2020 with a broadsheet format rather than their former tabloid-sized format.
