= The Woodinville Weekly =

Newspaper in Woodinville, Washington

- front page of the Woodinville Weekly from September 17, 2007
- Type: Weekly newspaper
- Owner(s): Eastside Media Corp
- Founder(s): Carol Edwards
- Publisher: Eric LaFontaine
- Editor: Bob Kirkpatrick
- Founded: 1976; 49 years ago
- Language: English
- Headquarters: 16932 Woodinville-Redmond Rd NE, Ste A101 Woodinville, WA 98072
- Circulation: 6,788 (as of 2017)
- ISSN: 2691-3798
- OCLC number: 22425564
- Website: woodinville.com

The Woodinville Weekly is a community newspaper in Woodinville, Washington, United States. Since 1992 it has been the legal newspaper of the City of Woodinville.

== History ==
The publication was founded by Carol Edwards in 1976. Edwards, originally from Seattle, moved to Woodinville that year from Riverside, California and started the paper at her home with a printing press she purchased at a garage sale. The first edition was published on November 1, 1976, and began free mail distribution to Woodinville residents in 1978.

According to the newspaper, it had a circulation of 30,000 in 2009.

In July 2019, the Weekly, along with Northlake News and Valley, was sold by owner Julie Boselly to the Bellevue-based Eastside Media Corp. In December 2024, the paper ceased its print edition and went online-only.

== See also ==
- The Seattle Times
