= Marysville Globe =

- Type: Weekly newspaper
- Format: Broadsheet
- Owner: Sound Publishing
- Founded: 1892
- Ceased publication: 2020
- Language: English
- Headquarters: 1085 Cedar Avenue; Marysville, Washington
- Circulation: 14,408 (as of 2012)
- Website: marysvilleglobe.com

The Marysville Globe was a weekly newspaper based in Marysville, Washington, United States. It is owned by Sound Publishing and published from 1892 to 2020.

== History ==
T. Hop first published the Marysville Globe on Feb. 2, 1892. He sold to Steve Saunders, who later that year bought the plant of the defunct Snohomish Independent. Saunders operated the Globe for nine years until selling it in 1901 to Richard Bushell Jr. A year later the paper's printing plant was destroyed in a fire.

Dewitt C. Owen owned and operated the paper for nearly 16 years until his death in 1932. It was then purchased from his estate by Leon L. Stock and he published it for six years until selling the Globe to Walter A. Dudley and his son Gerald. A. Dudley in 1938. They published the paper for five years until Sim R. Wilson purchased it in 1944.

The Wilson family ran the paper until selling it to Sun News, Inc. in 1997. A decade later the company sold the Globe and Arlington Times to Sound Publishing. The company suspended printing of several newspapers, including the Globe and Times, in March 2020 due to the economic effects of the COVID-19 pandemic. By April, furloughs and layoffs at Sound Publishing left both newspapers without any staff. There are no plans to resume publication of either the Globe or the Times as of 2025.

== Delivery ==
Since November 28, 2007, the Marysville Globe delivers one paper to every home with a Marysville address or in the city urban growth boundary/city limits.
