= David Brewster (journalist) =

American journalist (born 1939)

David C. Brewster
- Born: September 26, 1939 (age 87)
- Citizenship: United States
- Education: B.A., M.S. from Yale University
- Title: Founder, Board Chair, Editor-at-Large
- Predecessor: Chuck Taylor
- Board member of: Crosscut.com
- Spouse: Joyce Skaggs (1964–present)
- Children: Kate Eliza Brewster, Anne Olivia Brewster
- Parent(s): Gaylord Clark Brewster, Marjorie Jane Anderson
- Website: Crosscut.com

David Clark Brewster (born September 26, 1939) is an American journalist and the founder, editor and publisher of the Seattle Weekly and the Northwest news website Crosscut.com. He is also the founder, creator and former executive director of the nonprofit cultural center Town Hall Seattle.

== Biography ==
=== Early life ===
He was born on September 26, 1939, in Newark, New Jersey, the son of Gaylord Clark Brewster and Marjorie Jane Anderson. His father was a 1930 graduate of the University of Nebraska.

=== Education ===
He graduated in 1961, Phi Beta Kappa, with a Bachelor of Arts from Yale University in New Haven, Connecticut, and he received his master's degree from Yale University in 1963.

=== Family ===
In 1964, he married Joyce Skaggs, a 1961 graduate of Smith College. She was a writer for the Office of University Relations in the President's Office, at the University of Washington in Seattle, Washington. She retired from that position in 2008. She is the daughter of Charles Skaggs and Juanita ("Nita") Allen. David and Joyce are the parents of two daughters, Kate Eliza Brewster and Anne Olivia Brewster.

== Career ==
After graduating from Yale, he moved to Seattle in 1965 to teach English at the University of Washington. He left teaching after a couple of years to write for the Seattle Times, Argus magazine, and Seattle Magazine, then an arm of King Broadcasting. He was also an assignment editor for KING-TV.

Brewster was founding editor of the Seattle Weekly, which first published on March 31, 1976. Attorney Doug Raff and arts patron Bagley Wright were investors (investing $100,000) at start up (The Wright family eventually became the largest, though a minority holding, owners of the Weekly until it was sold in 1997). The free weekly paper focused on covering Seattle arts, culture and politics. He sold the paper 21 years later to Village Voice Publications for an unannounced sum.

He also originated the "Best Places" guidebook series covering Northwest (northern California to Alaska) dining, lodging and getaways. The series is published by Sasquatch Books.

He also jumped into the local Seattle political scene in the 1977 mayor's race, promoting Paul Schell (he lost that year to Charles Royer).

Brewster was involved in the founding of Crosscut.com, which specializes in coverage of the Northwest. He announced in November 2008 that the commercial venture into the world of Web journalism was shifting to nonprofit status, due to slow growth in online advertising and the current low rates for such ads.

Brewster participated in the repurposing and renovation of Fourth Church of Christ Scientist, once a Christian Science church in the First Hill neighborhood in Seattle, into a cultural venue. Now occupied by the nonprofit organization Town Hall Seattle, the site hosts events such as lectures and concerts.

Brewster is a former board member of Folio: The Seattle Anthenaeum, a private independent library in downtown Seattle which was founded in 2014.

== Sources ==
- Berlin, Leslie The man behind the microchip: Robert Noyce and the invention of Silicon Valley Publisher Oxford University Press US, 2005 ISBN 0-19-516343-5
- Burt, Daniel S. The chronology of American literature: America's literary achievements from the colonial era to modern times Houghton Mifflin Harcourt, 2004. ISBN 0-618-16821-4
- Jones, Emma C. Brewster. The Brewster Genealogy, 1566–1907: a Record of the Descendants of William Brewster of the "Mayflower," ruling elder of the Pilgrim church which founded Plymouth Colony in 1620. New York: Grafton Press, 1908.
