= Mercantile Library Association of San Francisco =

The San Francisco Mercantile Library Association (est. 1852) was a civic group organized in San Francisco, California, to "stimulate a generous rivalry in mental culture, by rendering it the fashion to read and converse on literary topics." Its founders J.B. Crockett, F.A. Woodworth, and F.C. Ewer aspired to "make our infant city as distinguished for literature and science as it already is for its commerce and wealth." By 1854 the group had collected for its library some 3,000 volumes. The library grew to 14,000 volumes by 1861, and to 36,000 by 1874. Holdings included travel writing, essays, plays, California history, American history, and literature by Chaucer, Shakespeare, and Sainte-Beuve. In 1906 the association merged into the San Francisco Mechanics' Institute. Later the same year an earthquake disaster ruined the combined collections. The Institute constructed a new Mechanics'-Mercantile Library building in 1910.
