= Crosscut.com =

News website in Seattle, Washington

Cascade PBS newsroom
- Former name: Crosscut.com
- Website type: Nonprofit news website
- Founded: 2007
- Headquarters: Seattle, Washington, United States
- Owner: Cascade Public Media
- Editors: Greg Hanscom; Joe Copeland; Drew Atkins
- Website: crosscut.com

The Cascade PBS newsroom, formerly Crosscut.com, is an American nonprofit news website based in Seattle. In contrast to traditional news organizations, the website mainly engages in analytic journalism. It merged with local PBS member station KCTS-TV in 2015, with both unifying under the Cascade PBS name in 2024.

== History ==
=== Founding ===
Former logo as Crosscut.com

Crosscut was founded in 2007 by David Brewster, who had previously started the Seattle Weekly in 1976 and launched Town Hall Seattle in 1999. Other investors included former Seattle mayor Paul Schell, former Seattle City Councilman and KING-TV commentator Jim Compton, and former KING Broadcasting Company president Stimson Bullitt.

=== Editors ===
Until November 2008, the site's editor was former Weekly and Seattle Union Record editor Chuck Taylor, who was also a reporter, editor, and graphic designer at the Seattle Times. He left Crosscut during its transition to a nonprofit. For almost a year, the site was edited by Brewster alone until former Seattle Post-Intelligencer and Seattle Times editor Mark Matassa joined in September 2009. Matassa only stayed with Crosscut for three months, leaving in December to join the administration of new Seattle mayor Mike McGinn. He was replaced by his sister, former Times journalist Michele Matassa-Flores, and former P-I columnist Joe Copeland. Matassa-Flores left in the summer of 2011. Crosscut's editorial team consisted of Greg Hanscom (executive editor), Drew Atkins (managing editor), and Copeland (senior editor) during its merger with local PBS member television and initial years as Cascade Public Media. Later editors included Florangela Davila, Victor Hernandez, and Mark Baumgarten.

=== Transition to a nonprofit ===
On November 17, 2008, Brewster announced that a switch to nonprofit status was being explored by Crosscut LLC, which necessitated temporary staff cuts. Brewster remained the only employee until September 2009, when grant funding finally materialized and Crosscut was able to hire an editor and support staff, including an editor, an advertising director, and eventually a Web developer.

In October 2009, Crosscut initiated its first pledge drive. Nearly 400 people donated money to support the site's continued existence.

=== Acquisition by KCTS-TV ===
On December 2, 2015, it was announced that KCTS-TV, a local PBS member television station based in Seattle, would merge with Crosscut and another website to form Cascade Public Media. The station's existing newsroom was merged with Crosscut's. KCTS-TV and Crosscut unified under the Cascade PBS name on March 1, 2024, coinciding with their move in January to a new facility on First Hill that formerly served as the longtime home of Childhaven.

Cascade PBS announced in September 2025 that it planned to lay off its local journalists and reporters as part of a cost reduction plan due to the end of federal funding for the Corporation for Public Broadcasting.

== Notable writers ==
- Knute Berger, who continued his column "Mossback" about the idiosyncrasies of Seattle living, history and politics, after leaving his post as editor-in-chief of the Seattle Weekly
- Charles Cross, former editor of The Rocket and Backstreets magazine, and author of several books about rock and roll history
- John Carlson, also a conservative talk radio host and television commentator
- David Kroman, city reporter, covering issues that include police reform and homelessness
- Melissa Santos. politics reporter, covering state government and the Legislature
- Samantha Larson, former science and tech reporter
- Drew Atkins, former managing editor and occasional contributor on a variety of subjects, including investigative pieces and in-depth features.
- Cambria Roth, formerly the site's Audience Engagement Coordinator, and also contributed articles
- David Brewster, a regular contributor in the site's early days.
- Chris Vance, covers politics with opinions
