= Roger Sale =

American literary critic (1932–2017)

Roger Sale (1932 – May 11, 2017) was an American literary critic and author, brother of Kirkpatrick Sale and father of Tim Sale. He spent most of his career as a professor of English at the University of Washington.

== Children's literature ==
Sale's influence on literary criticism is most evident in his work on children's literature. Prior to his work in the 1960s and 1970s, few professional critics chose to take children's literature seriously, but Sale argued that it could and ought to be given the same respect and scrutiny as adult fiction. In 1978, he published a book entitled Fairy Tales and After, which is essentially a collection of essays defending the literary value of children's literature, and then offering his critical perspective on authors from A. A. Milne to Rudyard Kipling to Beatrix Potter.

Sale is also credited with being among the first literary critics to seriously discuss the work of J. R. R. Tolkien (which had been largely dismissed as "juvenile" and unworthy of analysis by most prominent critics, most notably Lionel Trilling). His essay "Tolkien and Frodo Baggins" appeared in Tolkien and the Critics (ed. by Neal Isaacs and Rose Zimbardo) in 1968.

== Work as a journalist ==
Sale contributed frequently to the New York Review of Books, writing 39 reviews and articles for that publication from 1971 to 1983, and offering his critical opinion of such now-notable books as Ragtime by E. L. Doctorow and Dispatches by Michael Herr.

In an entirely different field, Sale served as an occasional columnist for the Seattle Weekly, an alternative newspaper, covering the Seattle SuperSonics' season and playoff performance for over twenty years.

== Work as a historian ==
Surprisingly, although Sale's training and life's work focused on English literature, he is today perhaps best known as the author of a book of history—specifically Seattle, Past to Present, which the L.A. Times called "among the best interpretive histories of a major American city" when it was published in 1976, and which Knute Berger, who wrote the introduction for the book's 2019 reissue, describes as a work that has "set a standard for subsequent histories" of Seattle.

== Retirement ==
Roger Sale continued to be a vivid source of literary and intellectual stimulation for colleagues and students after his retirement. He was a mentor to many young literary scholars, and graciously volunteered his time to teach literature courses for University Beyond Bars at Monroe Correctional Complex.

== Works ==
- Reading Spenser: An Introduction to The Faerie Queene, 1968
- On Writing, 1970
- Modern Heroism: Essays on D. H. Lawrence, William Empson and J.R.R. Tolkien, 1973
- On Not Being Good Enough: Writings of a Working Critic, 1979
- Closer to Home: Writers and Places in England, 1780–1830, 1986
