= Graffiti in Seattle =

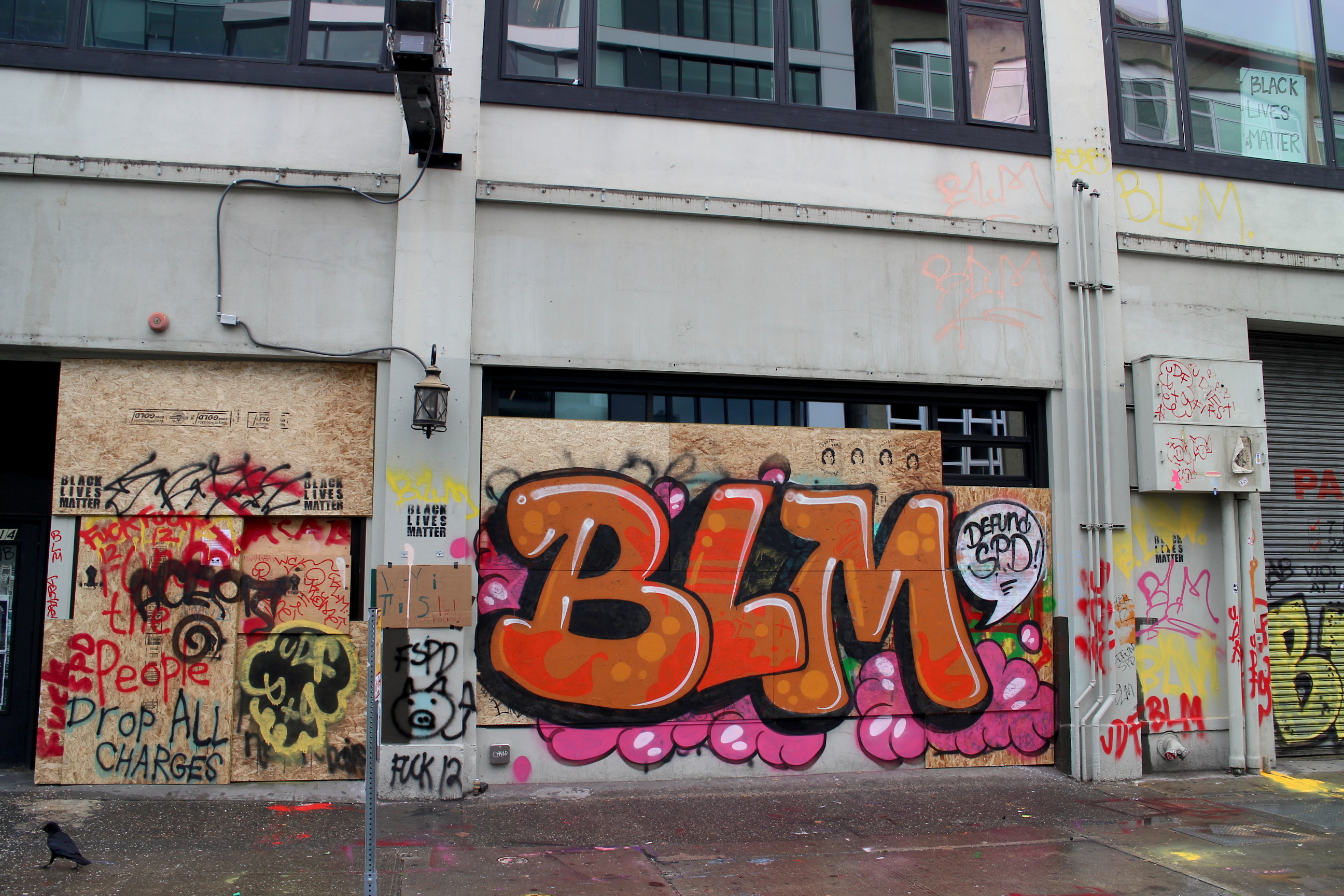
During the Capitol Hill Occupied Protest, June 2020

Graffiti is prevalent in and around Seattle, in the U.S. state of Washington.

== Prevalence ==
According to Crosscut.com, reports of graffiti filed by the public increased by more than 50 percent between 2019 and 2021. City agencies removed 5,000 and 8,700 tags in 2019 and 2021, respectively. In 2023, Gary Horcher of KIRO-TV said there were approximately 20,000 reports of graffiti in 2021 and wrote, "Seattle has been covered in more graffiti, and more graffiti is being covered up — at a higher cost to taxpayers — than ever before." Graffiti is often seen along Interstate 5.

== Legality ==
In 2023, a federal judge temporarily stopped Seattle police from making graffiti-related arrests. The ruling was appealed by a city attorney.

== Removal efforts ==
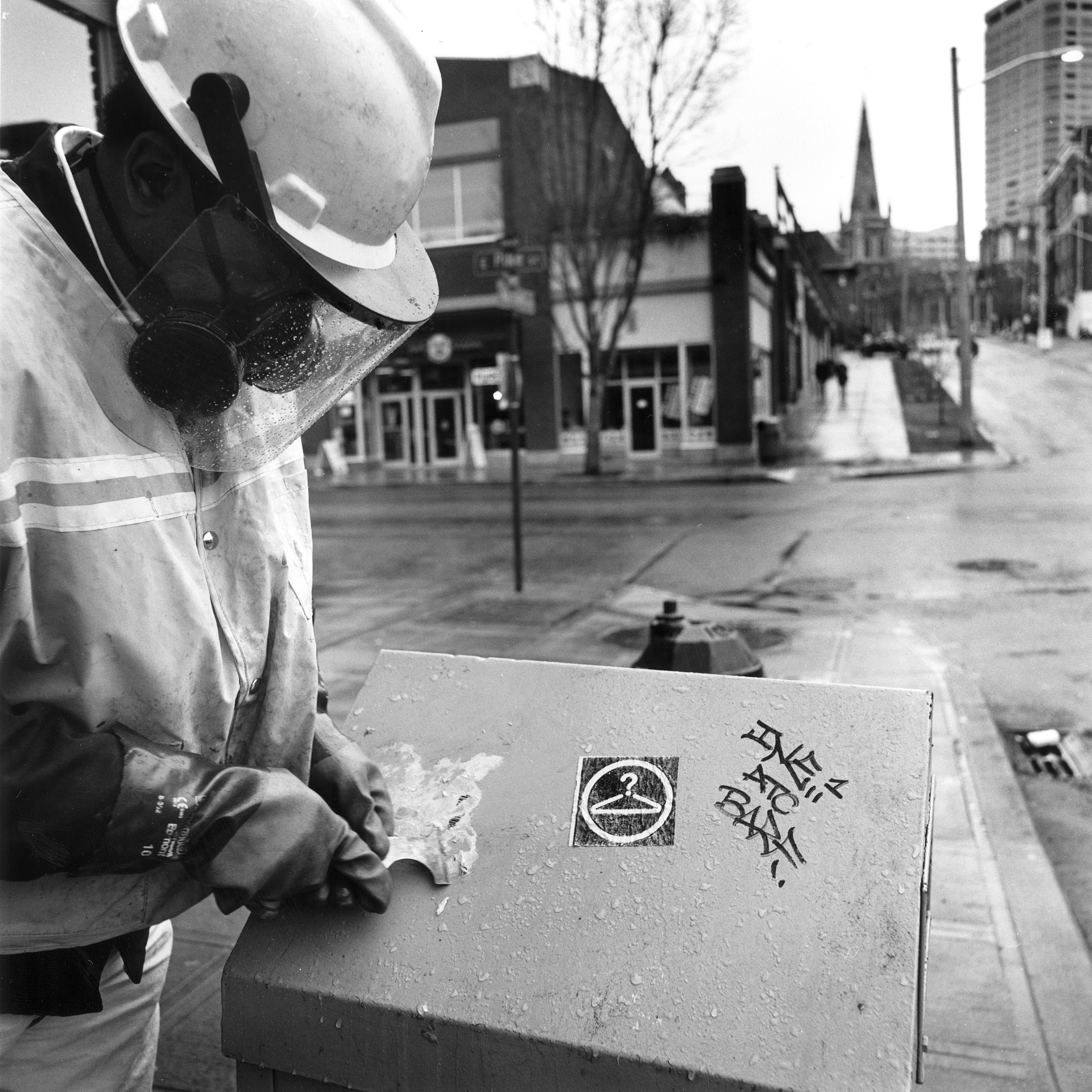
Worker removing graffiti at the corner of Pike and Harvard, 1999

Seattle Public Utilities created the Graffiti Rangers team in 1994 in an effort to remove graffiti on public property.

In October 2022, mayor Bruce Harrell announced the "One Seattle Graffiti Plan" to reduce graffiti as part of a larger city beautification project. Ahead of the 2023 Major League Baseball All-Star Game, Harrell relaunched the Graffiti Abatement Partnership, to focus on graffiti removal in downtown Seattle and the Chinatown–International District.
