= Lanier Library Association =

Coordinates: 35.2074°N 82.2392°W

The Lanier Library Association is a subscription library in Tryon, North Carolina. Established on 9 January 1889, it is named for Sidney Lanier. The Lanier Library Association is one of only sixteen solely membership libraries left in the United States. It is also known as a community library association.

== History ==
In 1889, five women from Tryon, North Carolina met and discussed the community’s need for a library. They subsequently decided to create a club that would offer a place for intellectual and cultural engagement for their community. The club’s first meeting was held on January 9, 1889. The library's first books were two volumes of poems by Sidney Lanier, donated to the library by his widow, Mary. The club's original membership dues were $0.60 per year. This community membership library would be housed in many places over the years: a church basement, the post office and various stores. In December 1905, a lot on Melrose Avenue would become the eventual permanent location of The Lanier Library Association.

As membership and donations increased, so did the need for additional space and resources. The Lanier Library does not receive any public funding but relies solely on its membership dues and additional donations.

== Membership ==
Membership fees are critical for The Lanier Library Association, as it does not receive any forms of government support. The Lanier Library Association is a non-profit organization. There are different levels of membership they offer. Individual memberships start at $50 annually, and there are additional levels that go up to $2500+.
