= Warrington Circulating Library =

Subscription library established in 1760

The Warrington Circulating Library of Warrington, England, was a subscription library established in 1760. (Note: Historian Edward Baines referred to it as the "General Subscription Library at Warrington.") It became part of the Warrington Museum in 1848. Supporters included Joseph Priestley.
