= Knute Berger =

American journalist, writer and editor

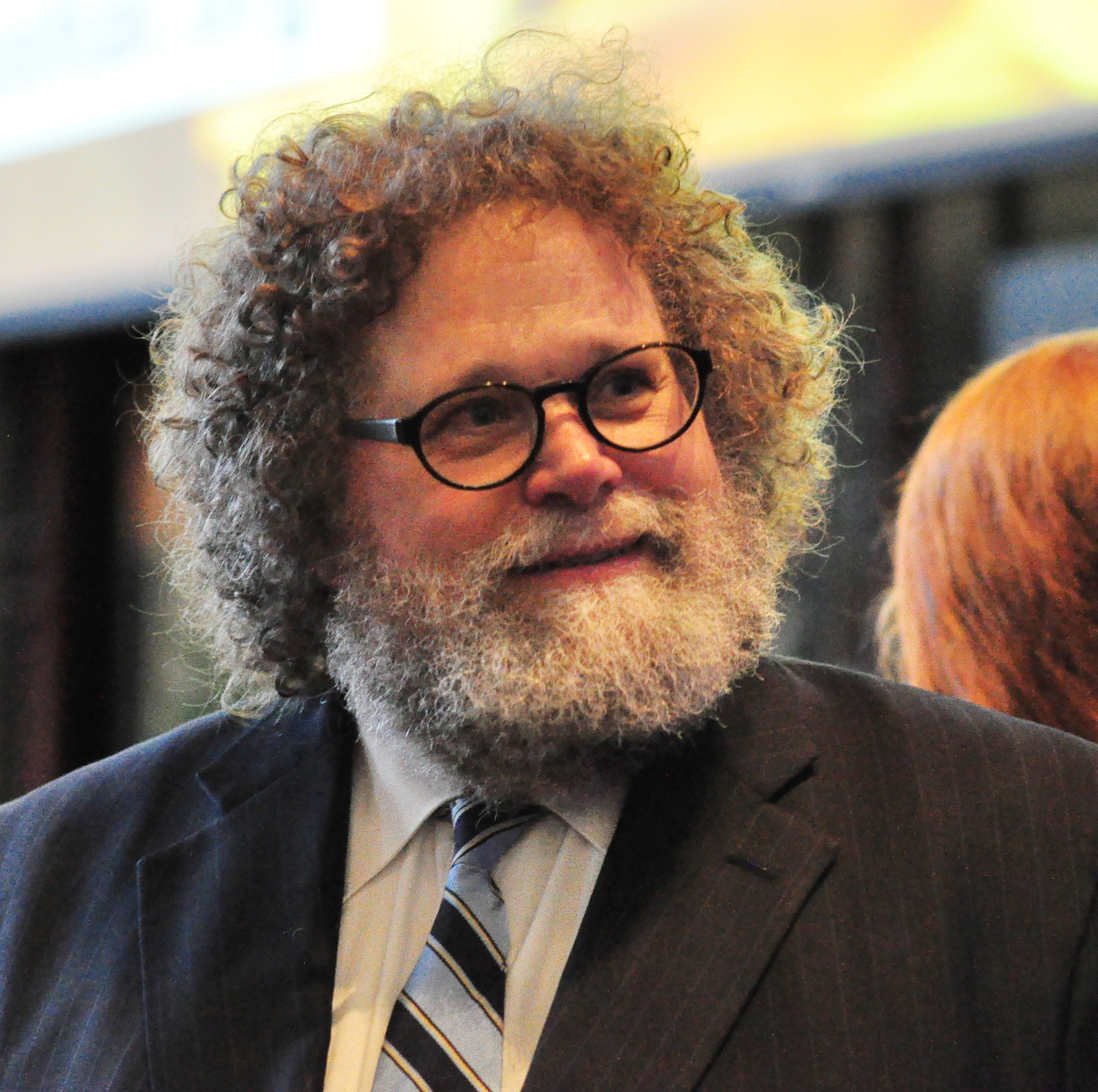
- Knute Berger in 2015
- Born: December 5, 1953 (age 72); Seattle, Washington, U.S.
- Occupations: Journalist, writer, editor
- Employer: Crosscut.com
- Known for: Writing on Pacific Northwest heritage, culture, politics and historic preservation
- Television: Mossback's Northwest (KCTS-TV)

Knute "Skip" Berger (born December 5, 1953 in Seattle) is an American journalist, writer and editor based in Seattle, Washington, United States. He has written since the 1970s about the culture and history of the Pacific Northwest, and appeared as a host on a public television series.

== Early life and education ==
Berger was born and raised in Seattle and attended Lakeside School there. He attended The Evergreen State College in Olympia, where he wrote for The Cooper Point Journal and received a B.A. in 1976.

== Writing ==
Berger is a columnist for Crosscut.com, writing under the name "Mossback". He is also Editor-at-Large and a columnist for Seattle magazine, author of Pugetopolis, and former longtime editor of the Seattle Weekly.

His writing focuses on Pacific Northwest subjects including heritage, culture, politics and historic preservation.

Berger writes frequently about World's Fairs, seven of which he has attended, including the Century 21 Exposition in his hometown of Seattle. In 2011, Berger was named "Writer in Residence" at the landmark of the 1962 Century 21 Expo, the Space Needle, in anticipation of the Expo's Fiftieth Anniversary. Commissioned by the owners of the Space Needle, he penned its official history for the anniversary in Space Needle: The Spirit of Seattle, published in 2012.

== Television and other media ==
As part of the partnership between sister organizations Crosscut and KCTS-TV, Berger began hosting the short television series Mossback's Northwest in 2018. In the series, he discusses a part of the Northwest's cultural history.

After the television show, Berger was a commentator on Seattle radio station KUOW-FM and at public forums.

== Time capsule ==
Berger was selected by the Washington State Centennial Commission to install a time capsule beneath the rotunda of the Washington State Capitol.

== Regard as an expert ==
Berger's writing about Seattle has been cited in a work on urban planning in the Pacific Northwest by the American Planning Association, and a work on its social history presented at an Austrian academic conference.

== Bibliography ==
- Pugetopolis: A Mossback Takes on Growth Addicts, Weather Wimps, and the Myth of Seattle Nice. Sasquatch Books. 2008. ISBN 978-1-57061-572-6.
- Space Needle: The Spirit of Seattle. Documentary Media LLC. 2012. ISBN 978-1-933245-25-6.
- Knute Berger (1976). "Introduction". In Sale, Roger (ed.). Seattle, Past to Present. University of Washington Press. pp. ix–xx. OCLC 2283786.
