= Chuck Taylor (journalist, born 1957) =

American journalist

- Born: Charles L. Taylor; 1957 (age 67–68); Hanover, New Hampshire, U.S.
- Occupation: Journalist
- Employer: The Everett Herald

Charles L. Taylor (born 1957) is an American journalist based in Seattle. Since late 2010, he has worked as an editor at The Everett Herald in Everett, Washington. He designed the website and supervised the staff of Crosscut.com in Seattle, and worked as managing editor of Seattle Weekly. Taylor was an editor and reporter at The Seattle Times and the Tri-City Herald in Kennewick, Washington.

During the Pacific Northwest Newspaper Guild Strike in 2000, he was the managing editor of the revived Seattle Union Record. He attended Whitman College in Walla Walla, Washington, graduating in 1979. Taylor was born in Hanover, New Hampshire and grew up in Ohio and Michigan.
