= Mechanics' Institute Chess Club =

Chess club in San Francisco

Coordinates: 37.7888°N 122.403°W

- Type: Regional Chess Club
- Founded: 1854
- Location: San Francisco, California
- Country: United States
- Affiliation: Mechanics' Institute
- Website: Chess Page

The Mechanics' Institute Chess Club is a chess club in San Francisco, California, United States. Hosted at the Mechanics' Institute, it is the oldest continuously operating chess club in the US. Today the Mechanics' Institute hosts weekly Tuesday evening marathon events, free events, national and international chess tournaments, offers virtual and onsite classes, and provides scholastic chess classes in partnership with local schools. The chess room holds 40 chess sets and three computers. Members also have a reciprocal membership with the Marshall Chess Club in Manhattan.

== Events ==
The chess club also hosts free chess classes and scholastic programs. Some free events are supported by grants from the US Chess Federation.

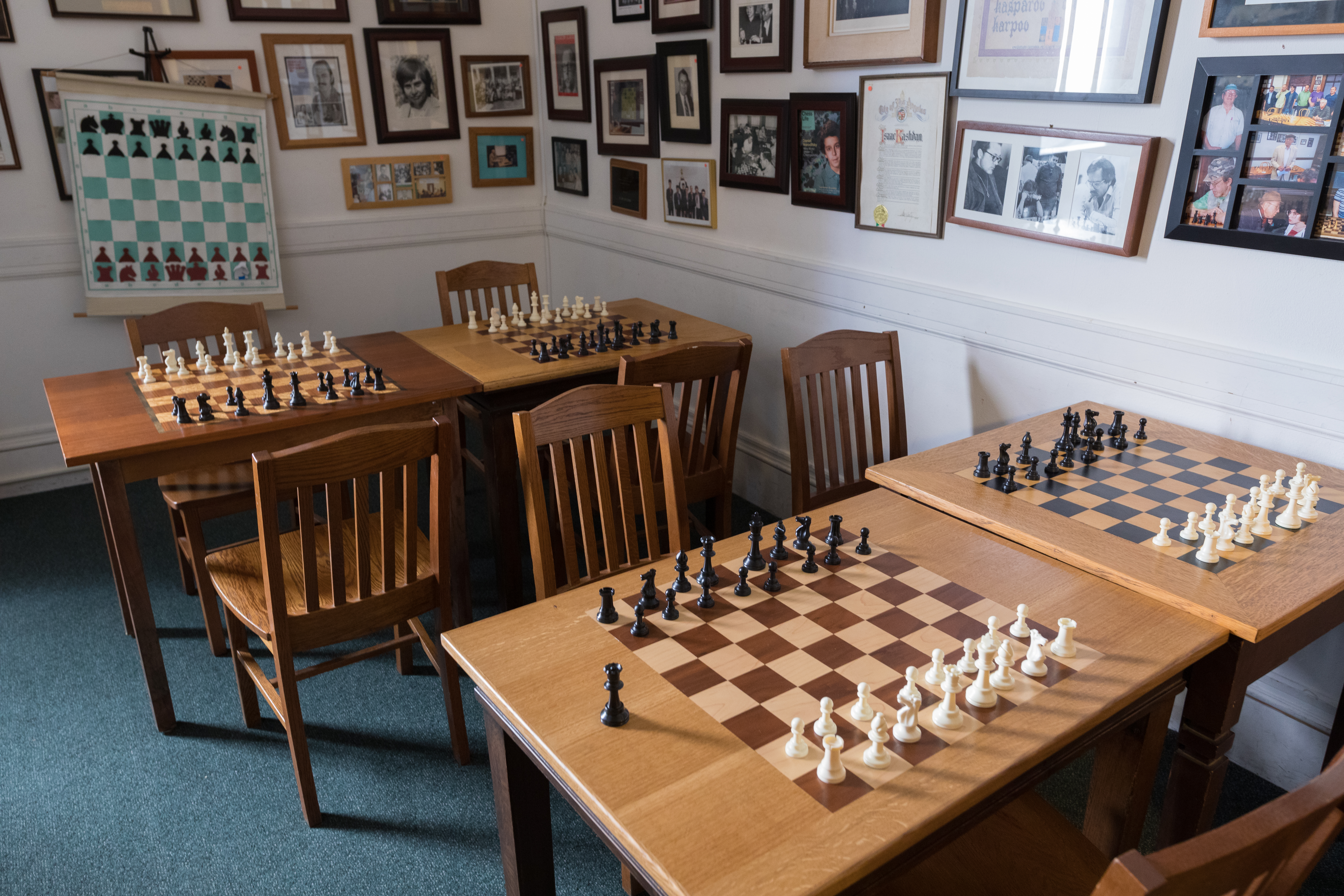
Mechanics’ Institute Chess Room

The club has hosted marathon chess events on Tuesday nights since 1972, making it the longest-running weekly tournament in the United States. At a winter 2015 Tuesday evening marathon event, the chess club set its attendance record with 121 players. It often starts with a lecture, sometimes by a chess master, before playing games. As of 2023, the events were often sold out.

Every world chess champion from 1900 to 1999 has visited the chess room to sign its register, including Bobby Fischer. The author of The Queen's Gambit, Walter Tevis, played tournaments at the Chess Club. Vinay Bhat became the youngest person to become a grandmaster in 2008 after training at the Chess Club. In 2009, one of the chess club's young students, 12-year-old Daniel Naroditsky, won the World Championship for his age group.
