= Subscription library =

Library that requires payment to become a member

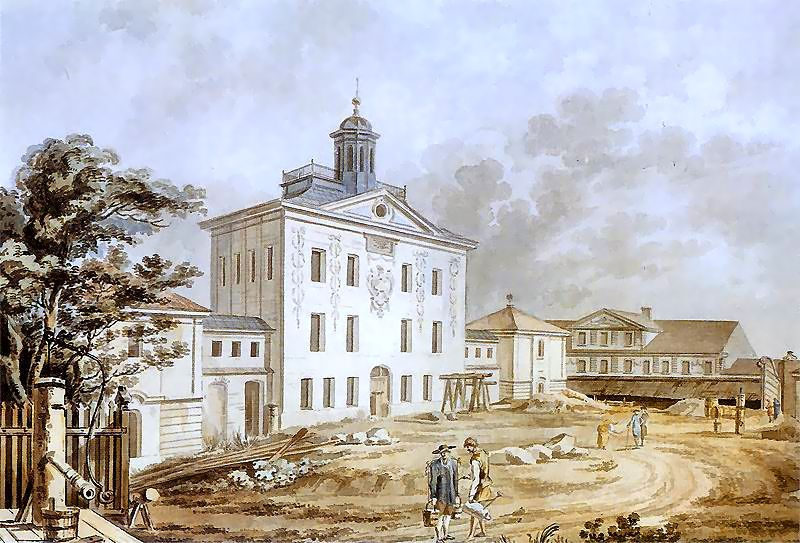
Biblioteka Załuskich, built in Warsaw in the mid-18th century

A subscription library (or membership library) is a library that is financed by private funds either from membership fees or endowments. Historically, they are predecessors to the public library as it is known today. Unlike a public library, access is often restricted to members, but access rights can also be given to non-members, such as students. Through time, different library types have been grouped under this term, but may represent the following library models. A library formed as a joint stock company can be called a proprietary model. Some libraries allowed individuals who were not stock holders to subscribe for given time periods, and were thus labeled subscription libraries. Athenaeums were similar to social libraries and provided the additional benefit of scholarly publications and cultural programming. The term mechanics or mercantile library refers to institutions established, often by benefactors, for the benefit of the working class.

== Origins ==
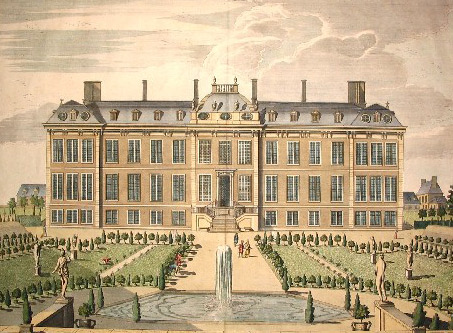
The British Museum was established in 1751 and had a library containing over 50,000 books.

In the 18th century, there were virtually no public libraries in the modern sense, i.e. libraries provided from public funds and freely accessible to all. Only one important library in Britain, Chetham's Library in Manchester, was fully and freely accessible to the public. However, during the century, there came into being a whole network of library provision on a private or institutional basis.

The increase in secular literature at this time encouraged the establishment of commercial subscription libraries. Many small, private book clubs evolved into subscription libraries, charging high annual fees or requiring subscribing members to purchase shares. Subscription libraries would in turn use these earnings to expand their collections and later create their own publications. Unlike a public library, access was often restricted to members. Some of the earliest such institutions were founded in Britain, such as Chetham's Library in 1653, Innerpeffray Library in 1680 and Thomas Plume's Library in 1704. In the American colonies, the Library Company of Philadelphia was started in 1731 by Benjamin Franklin in Philadelphia, Pennsylvania. By paying an initial fee and annual dues, members had access to books, maps, fossils, antique coins, minerals, and scientific instruments. This library began with 50 members, swelled to 100 quickly, and then grew prosperous enough to begin to publish its own books. When the Continental Congress met in Philadelphia, they did so in the same building as Franklin's Library Company and delegates were given member privileges for the library. Franklin's subscription library became so popular that many subscription libraries were founded in the colonies, making him remark that it was, "the mother of all the North American subscription libraries, now so numerous". The first dozen subscription libraries were established in Pennsylvania, Rhode Island, South Carolina, Massachusetts, New York, Connecticut, and Maine by the 1750s.

The first subscription library in Canada, The Quebec Library/Bibliotheque de Quebec, opened in 1783.

The materials available to subscribers tended to focus on particular subject areas, such as biography, history, philosophy, theology and travel, rather than works of fiction, particularly the novel.

Subscription libraries were democratic in nature; created by and for communities of local subscribers who aimed to establish permanent collections of books and reading materials, rather than selling their collections annually as the circulating libraries tended to do, in order to raise funds to support their other commercial interests. Even though the subscription libraries were often founded by reading societies, committees, elected by the subscribers, chose books for the collection that were general, rather than aimed at a particular religious, political or professional group. The books selected for the collection were chosen because they would be mutually beneficial to the shareholders. The committee also selected the librarians who would manage the circulation of materials.

Subscription libraries were also referred to as 'proprietary' libraries due to the expectation that subscribers not only pay an annual fee, but that they must also invest in shares. These shares could be transferred by sale, gift or bequest. Many could not afford to purchase shares to become a member, even though they may have belonged to reading clubs.

=== Commercial circulating libraries ===
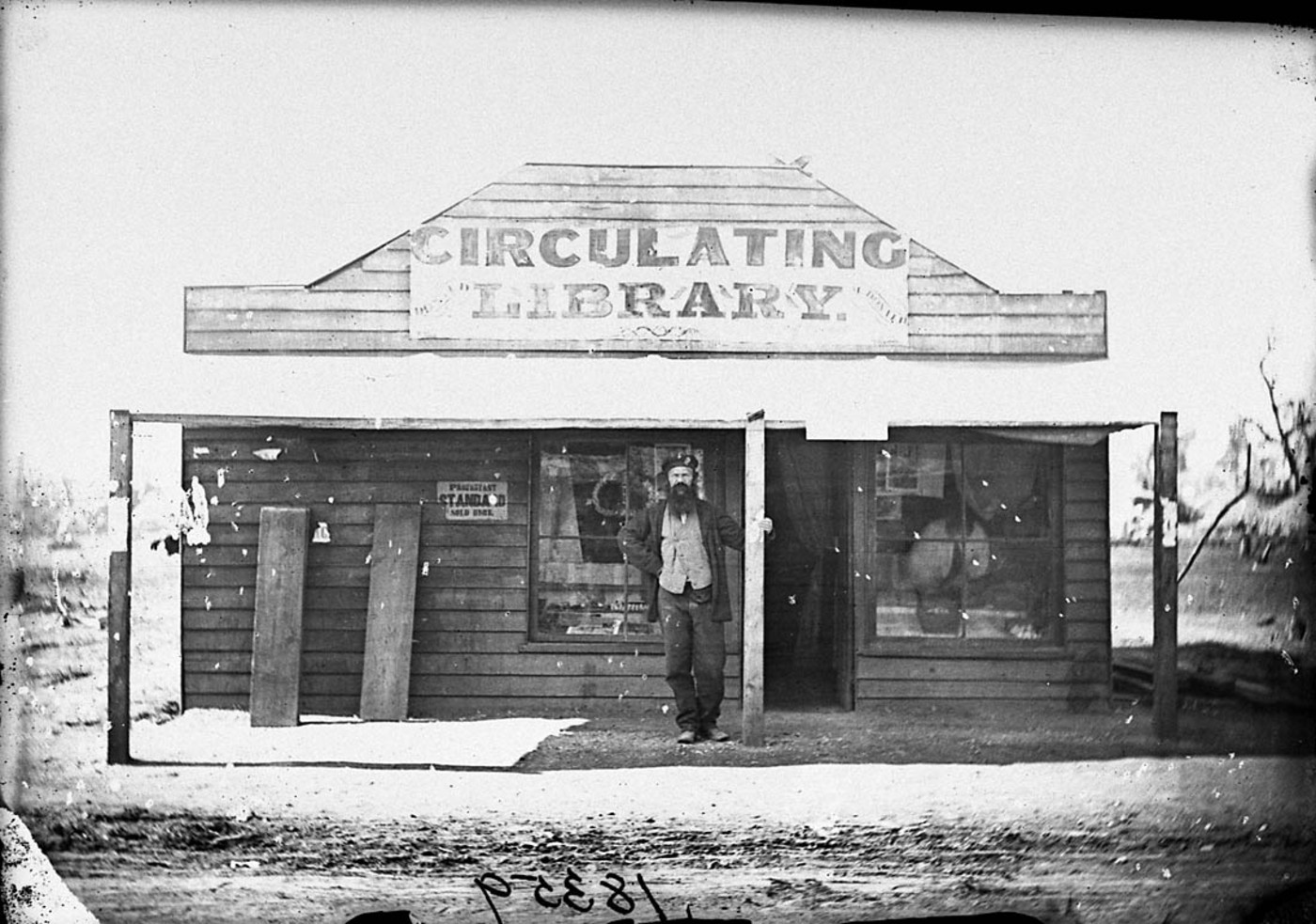
Circulating library and stationery shop, Gulgong, Australia, 1870

The increasing production and demand for fiction promoted by rising literacy rates and the expansion of commercial markets, led to the rise of circulating libraries, which met a need that subscription libraries did not fulfill, as subscription libraries did not "cater to the public taste for romance and popular fiction".

William Bathoe opened his commercial venture at two locations in London in 1737, and claimed to have been 'the Original Circulating library'. An early circulating library may even have been established in the mid-17th century; in an edition of "Tom Tyler and his Wife" in 1661 Francis Kirkman included a catalogue of 690 plays which he claimed to be ready to lend "upon reasonable considerations" from his premises in Westminster.

Circulating libraries charged subscription fees to users and offered serious subject matter as well as the popular novels, thus the difficulty in clearly distinguishing circulating from subscription libraries. Occasionally subscription libraries called themselves 'circulating libraries', and vice versa.

Many ordinary circulating libraries might call themselves 'subscription' libraries because they charged a subscription, while the earliest private subscription libraries, such as Leeds, Warrington, or Liverpool, describe themselves as 'circulating' libraries in their titles. Since many circulating libraries called themselves after the town where they were situated, it is often difficult to distinguish the type of a particular library, especially since many are only known to posterity from a surviving book label, with nothing but the name as identification.

In Britain there were more than 200 commercial circulating libraries open in 1800, more than twice the number of subscription and private proprietary libraries that were operating at the same time. Many proprietors pandered to the most fashionable clientele, making much ado about the sort of shop they offered, the lush interiors, plenty of room and long hours of service. "These 'libraries' would be called rental collections today."

With the advent of free public libraries in the 19th century, most subscription libraries were replaced or taken over by the governing authorities.

=== Learned societies ===
In London, numerous scientific dabblers, amateurs, and professionals concentrated in the comparatively small geographic area began to form a unique development – the learned society:

These societies are voluntary associations of men and women who have come together because they are interested in the aims and objects which the societies serve and they feel that they can pursue those interests better as members of a society, rather than as individuals. The libraries therefore have been collected together for the purpose of serving the objects to which the various societies are dedicated and they do this, for the most part, by serving their members.

Learned society libraries were private but were owned by larger groups of people. Materials were often lent or borrowed by qualified individuals or institutions outside the society. Societies were concerned mainly with the sciences, physical and biological, and often cooperated with other groups like the Royal Society.

Exclusive subscription libraries, the world's oldest being the Chemical Society in London, was founded in 1841 for the general advancement of chemistry. Its primary objective was to guide and direct original research in chemistry and to disseminate that knowledge through debates, lectures and its own Journal.

== Current membership libraries ==
=== Australia ===
- 1833: Sydney Mechanics' School of Arts
- 1839: Melbourne Athenaeum
- 1854: PMI Victorian History Library

=== Canada ===
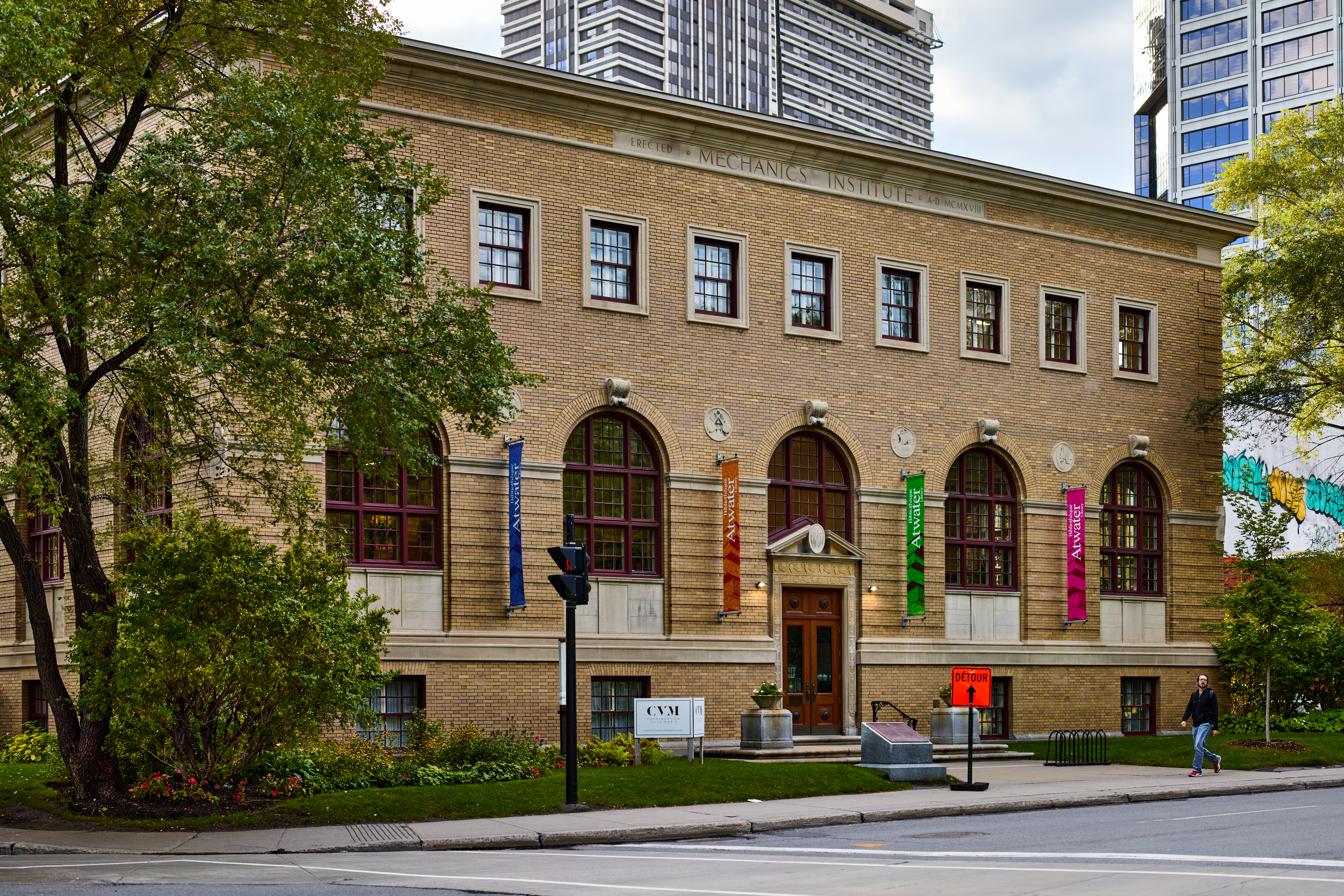
Atwater Library of the Mechanics Institute of Montreal

- 1824: Literary and Historical Society of Quebec
- 1828: Atwater Library of the Mechanics' Institute of Montreal
- 1876: Library of Parliament

=== Ireland ===
- 1922: Central Catholic Library

=== France ===
- 1920: American Library in Paris

=== Thailand ===
- 1921: Neilson Hays Library – originally (1869) the Bangkok Ladies' Library Association

=== United Kingdom ===
- 1741: The Leadhills Miners' Library in Scotland – oldest subscription library in the British Isles
- 1768: Leeds Library – oldest active subscription library in the UK
- 1788: Linen Hall Library – last subscribing library in Northern Ireland
- 1793: The Literary and Philosophical Society of Newcastle upon Tyne
- 1793: Westerkirk Parish Library
- 1797: The Athenaeum (Liverpool)
- 1799: Tavistock Subscription Library
- 1800: Langholm Library
- 1806: Portico Library
- 1810: Plymouth Proprietary Library
- 1812: Plymouth Athenaeum Library
- 1813: Devon and Exeter Institution
- 1816: Nottingham Subscription Library
- 1818: Morrab Library
- 1824: Bath Royal Literary and Scientific Institution
- 1824: Ipswich Institute Reading Room and Library
- 1832: Bradford Mechanics' Institute Library
- 1832: Saffron Walden Town Library Society (now called the Gibson Library)
- 1834: Guildford Institute of the University of Surrey
- 1839: Highgate Literary and Scientific Institution
- 1841: London Library
- 1854: Birmingham and Midland Institute
- 1889: Saint Deiniol's Residential Library (now known as Gladstone's Library)
- 1894: Bishopsgate Institute
- 1912: Armitt Library
- 1928: Sybil Campbell Library

=== United States ===
- 1731: Library Company of Philadelphia
- 1747: Redwood Library and Athenaeum
- 1748: Charleston Library Society
- 1753: Providence Athenaeum
- 1754: New York Society Library
- 1760: Newtown Library Company
- 1795: Lexington (Kentucky) Library Society
- 1804: Social Law Library
- 1807: Boston Athenæum
- 1810: Salem Athenaeum
- 1814: Athenaeum of Philadelphia
- 1816: New Orleans Library Society
- 1817: Portsmouth Athenaeum
- 1820: General Society of Mechanics and Tradesmen of the City of New York
- 1820: Maine Charitable Mechanic Association Library of Portland
- 1820: New York Mercantile Library
- 1826: The Institute Library (New Haven)
- 1835: Mercantile Library of Cincinnati
- 1846: St. Louis Mercantile Library Association
- 1853: Congregational Library & Archives
- 1854: San Francisco Mechanics' Institute
- 1890: Lanier Library Association (Lanier Library of North Carolina)
- 1897: Timrod Library
- 1899: Athenaeum Music & Arts Library of La Jolla
- 1900: Milford Mystery Library of Milford, Ohio
- 1902: The Tabard Inn Library stations managed by The Book Lover's Library
- 1947: Mendocino Community Library
- 1999: John Trigg Ester Library
- 2015: Folio: The Seattle Athenaeum
