= Folio: The Seattle Athenaeum =

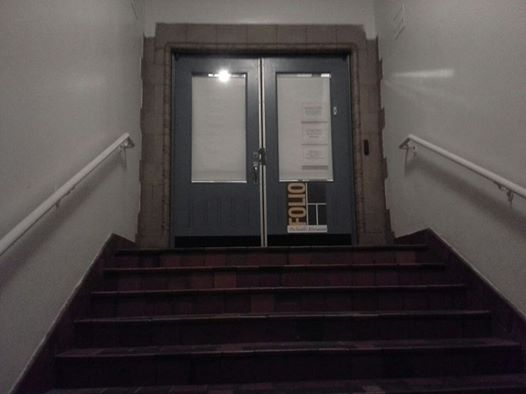
Folio: The Seattle Athenaeum's front door was in the historic Army & Navy Entrance to the Seattle YMCA Building, on Marion Street between Third and Fourth Avenues

Folio: The Seattle Athenaeum is a membership-based library located in downtown Seattle, Washington. It was founded as a nonprofit corporation spearheaded by David Brewster in 2015, and opened in January, 2016. It occupies a portion of the southern end of the YMCA Central Branch Building, a Seattle city landmark brick building constructed about 1930. The library's website describes it as "... a gathering place for books and the people who love them. Devoted to the intellectually curious, Folio offers circulating collections, vibrant conversations, innovative cultural and civic programs, and work spaces for writers. Come to Folio for an hour or a day. The books are waiting for you."

Initial membership was 300 and the initial collection contained 15,000 books. Folio is open Monday to Saturday.

In the summer of 2018, Folio moved from its original location at the YMCA into an upstairs suite in the Economy Building at the Pike Place Market, 93 Pike Street #307.

There are several other subscription libraries in the metropolitan cities around the United States including Boston, San Francisco, New York, London, San Diego, Providence, Newport, Cincinnati and Philadelphia. Folio has a reciprocal membership with the Mechanics' Institute in San Francisco.
