= Mechanics' Institute, San Francisco =

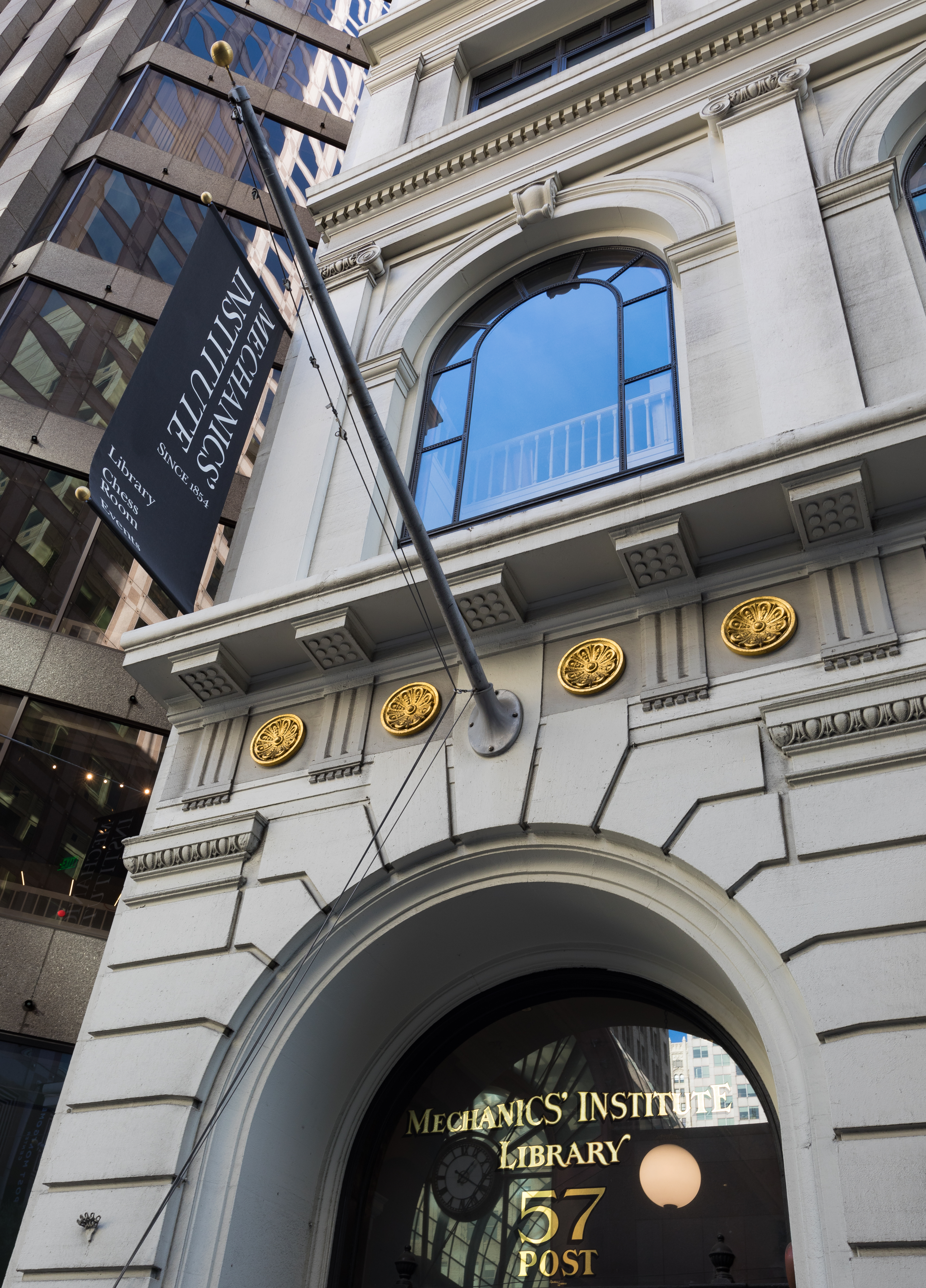
- Mechanics' Institute Library and Chess Room

General information
- Status: Used as a library, cultural event center, and chess club
- Location: 57 Post Street, Financial District of San Francisco, United States
- Coordinates: 37°47′19″N 122°24′10″W
- Construction started: 1854

Design and construction
- Architect: William Patton

Mechanics' Institute is a historic membership library, cultural event center, and chess club housed at 57 Post Street, San Francisco, California. It was founded in 1854 as a mechanics' institute, an educational and cultural institution to serve the vocational needs of out-of-work gold miners looking to share skills and ideas. Today the Institute serves readers, writers, downtown employees, students, film lovers, chess players, and others in search of learning and a community for the exchange of ideas.

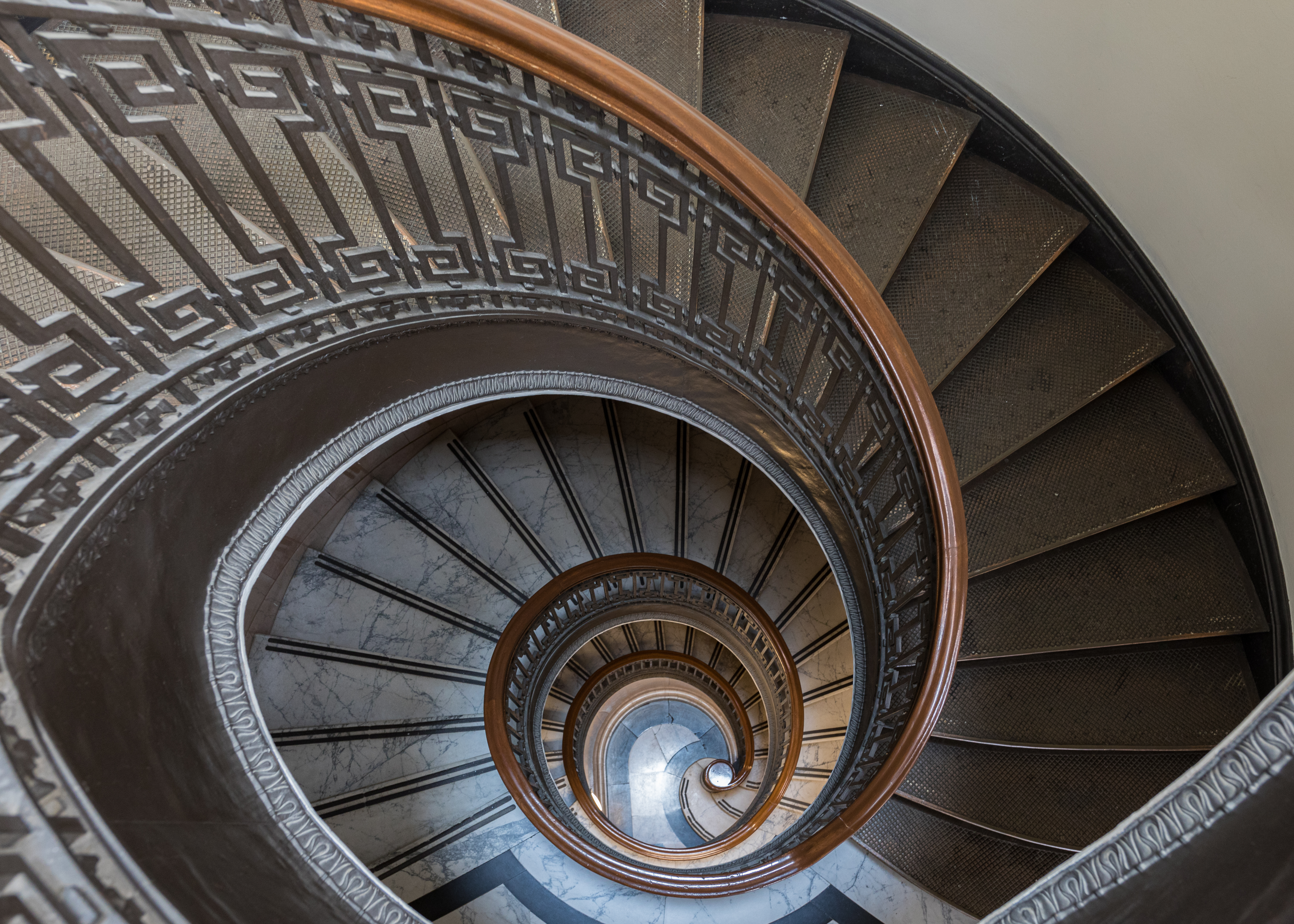
Spiral staircase of the Institute

== History ==
In 1848, the discovery of gold lured people from all over the world to California. By 1853 most surface gold was mined out, pushing the town of San Francisco into economic decline. A flood of former miners suddenly had no employment and no skills nor prospects. Mechanics' Institute began in 1854 with four books, a chess and games room, and a mission to become a vocational and cultural center. At this time, California had no colleges or universities and no public libraries. (The San Francisco Public Library did not open until 1879.) The institute became the most important center for adult education in San Francisco. Initially a library dedicated to the mechanical arts, the Institute merged with the Mercantile Library Association which broadened its collection beyond technical subjects in 1906.

Within a few years, Mechanics' Institute was offering classes in such subjects as woodworking, mechanical drawing, industrial design, electrical science, applied mathematics, and ironwork. The Institute's importance in technical education in California reached a pinnacle in 1868 when the California legislature granted a charter to the University of California to establish itself as a university. The Institute participated in the fledgling university's first years, hosting technical classes and presenting lectures on many topics. Members of Mechanics' Institute helped develop the university curriculum and have held a seat on the Board of Regents continuously until 1974.

Aside from educational endeavors, the Institute also promoted industry in the San Francisco Bay Area. Beginning in 1857, on land donated by the land baron James Lick, the Institute hosted famous industrial fairs that displayed inventions, art, and products of all kinds to thousands of visitors. According to the Institute, awards were presented to winning exhibitors —many of whom are still in business today, including Levi Strauss for their copper-riveted denim trousers.

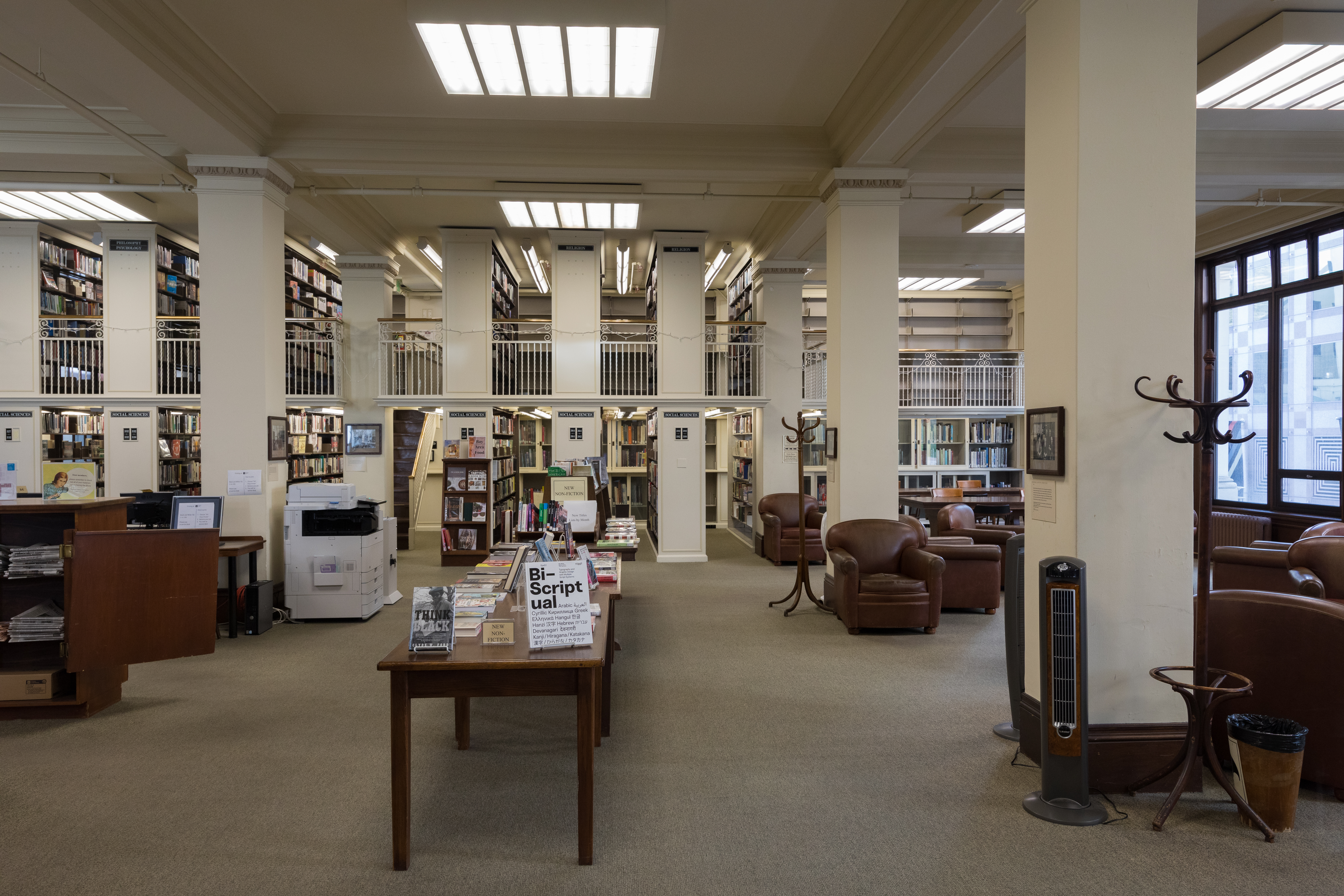
Library

According to the Institute, the Mechanics' Institute purchased a building site at 36 Post Street, between Montgomery and Kearny, in 1866 where the Institute erected a three-story building. The building featured retail space on the ground floor, a library with open stacks, a lecture hall for about six hundred people, a chess room, a furnished ladies' sitting room, and other rooms for rental by committees, lodges, and related scientific organizations. During the Mechanics’ Pavillion’s twenty-three years, speakers including U.S. presidents would address crowds there. In April 1906, as with much of the surrounding community, the Institute and its collections (including 200,000 volumes) were destroyed in the San Francisco earthquake and fire.

By 1910 a new Beaux-arts building, designed by Albert Pissis, was built at 57 Post St. where today it remains a landmark of San Francisco architecture and home to all of Mechanics' Institute's activities and programs.

Herb Caen was a member.

=== Modern day ===
The library has acquired a number of volumes from the Arion Press in its collection.

In 2010, SFist called it 'the cheapest, least-snooty private club in town.' It has reciprocal memberships with other membership clubs in the United States including Folio: The Seattle Athaneum, Athenaeum of Philadelphia, New York Society Library, The Center for Fiction, and the Redwood Library and Athaneum among others.

In 2015 the Institute had 4500 members. The two-story library, the centerpiece of the Institute, held roughly 150,000 volumes in 2018. As of 2026, memberships cost $150 per year (and $80 for students) and has 2900 members. Membership at the Mechanics' Institute has always been open to all members of the public since its founding, including women which was rare at a time when many organizations excluded members based on sex or race. As of 2023, it ran 5-15 events each week, including a free public tour every Wednesday at noon. Chess events are common on Tuesdays and CinemaLit film screenings and discussions on Fridays.

In 2026, a book was returned that had been checked out before the 1906 earthquake and fire burned that burned the books in the library.

== Chess ==
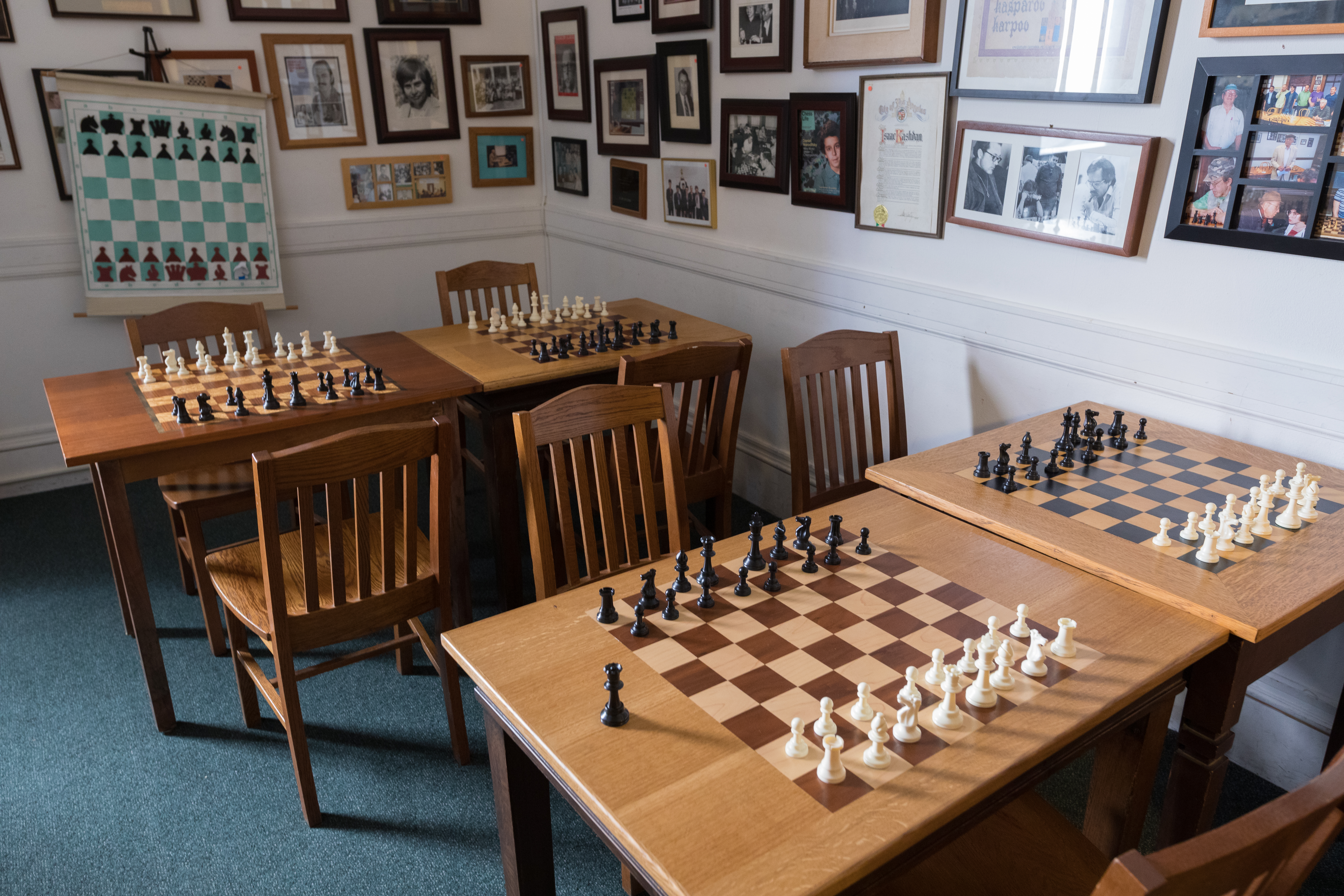
Chess Club room

The Mechanics' Institute is home to the Mechanics' Institute Chess Club, the oldest continuously operating chess club in the United States. The chess club hosts free chess classes and scholastic programs in addition to member events such as weekly Tuesday night marathons. The room holds 40 chess sets and 3 computers.

The chess club also hosts national and international chess tournaments, offers virtual and onsite classes, and provides scholastic chess classes in partnership with local schools. Every world chess champion from 1900-1999 has visited the chess room to sign its register including Bobby Fischer. The author of Queen’s Gambit, Walter Tevis played tournaments at the Chess Club. Vinay Bhat became the youngest person to become a grandmaster in 2008 after training at the Chess Club. In 2009 one of the chess club's young students, 12-year-old Daniel Naroditsky, won the World Championship for his age group.

Members also have a reciprocal membership with the Marshall Chess Club in Manhattan.

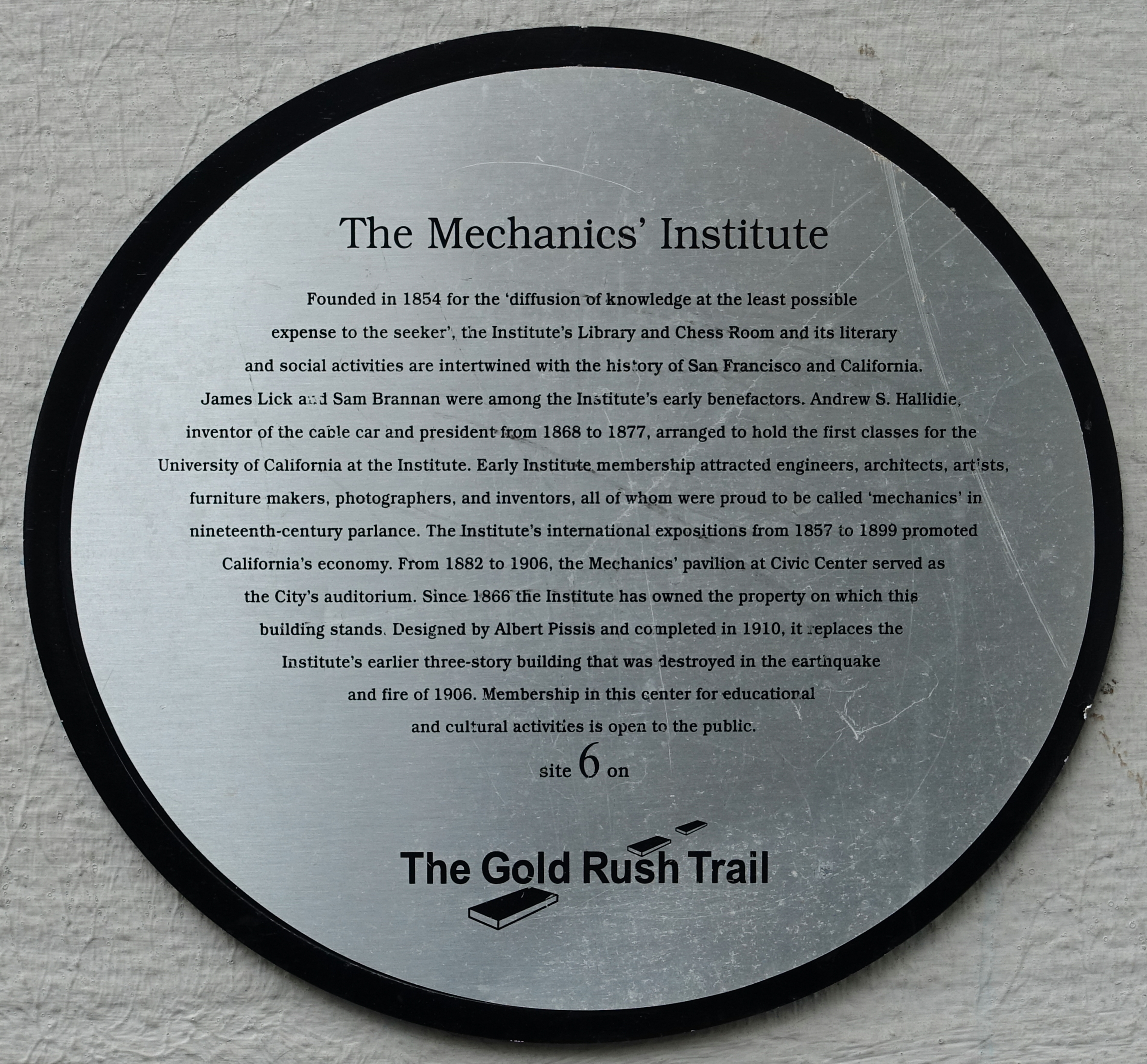
History plaque

== See also ==
- A. W. Piper, Seattle confectioner and politician, trained at the Mechanics' Institute in 1857
- List of San Francisco Designated Landmarks
