= Town Hall Seattle =

Historic performance hall

- Fourth Church of Christ, Scientist
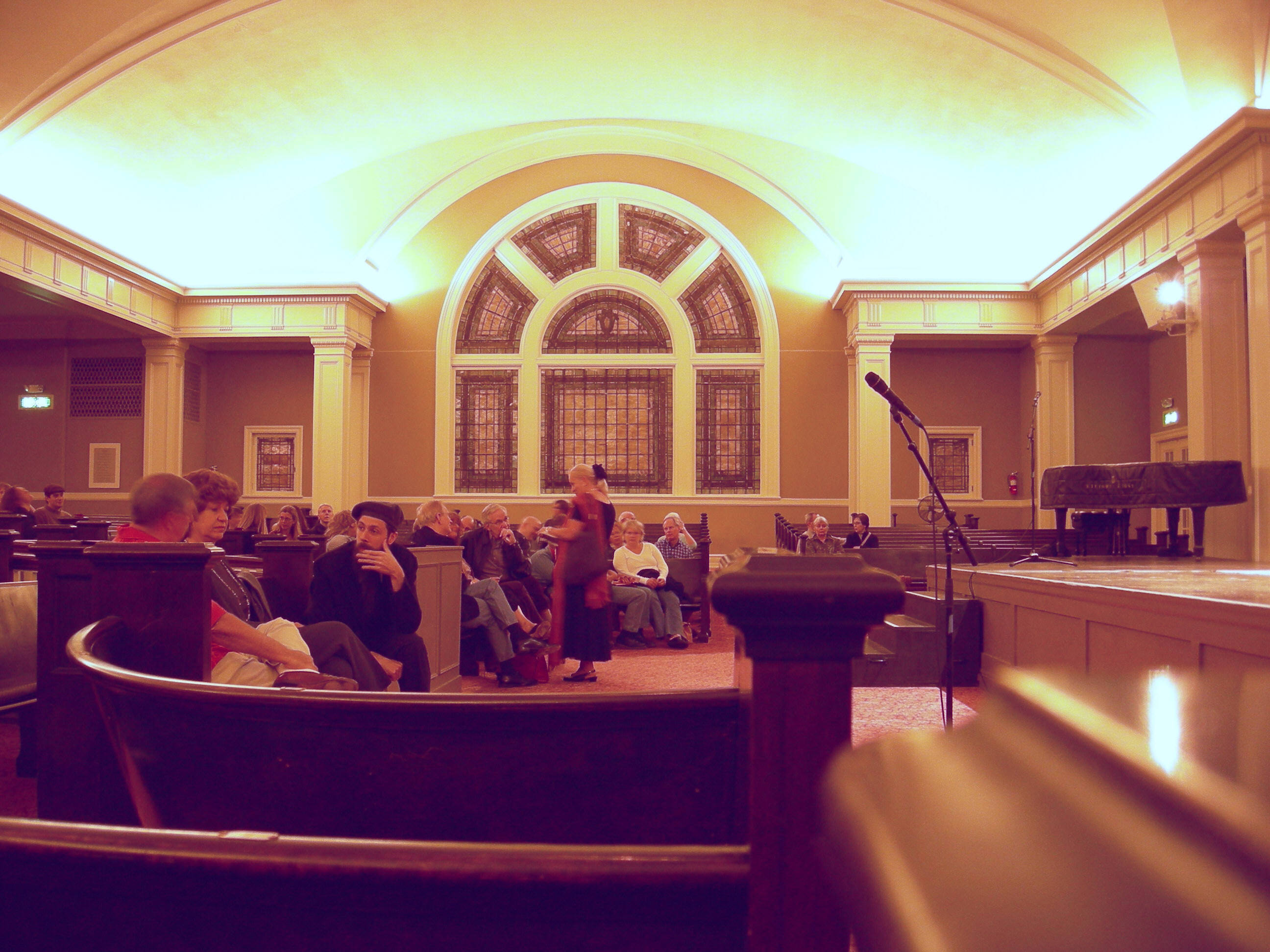
- Main auditorium of Town Hall, 2006
- Interactive map of Town Hall Seattle
- Address: 1119 Eighth Avenue; Seattle, Washington; United States
- Owner: Town Hall Association
- Capacity: Great Hall: 832; Downstairs at Town Hall: 275
- Current use: Cultural center

Construction
- Opened: 1916, 1922
- Reopened: March 1999
- Architect: George Foote Dunham

Website
- www.townhallseattle.org
- Fourth Church of Christ, Scientist
- U.S. National Register of Historic Places
- Seattle Landmark
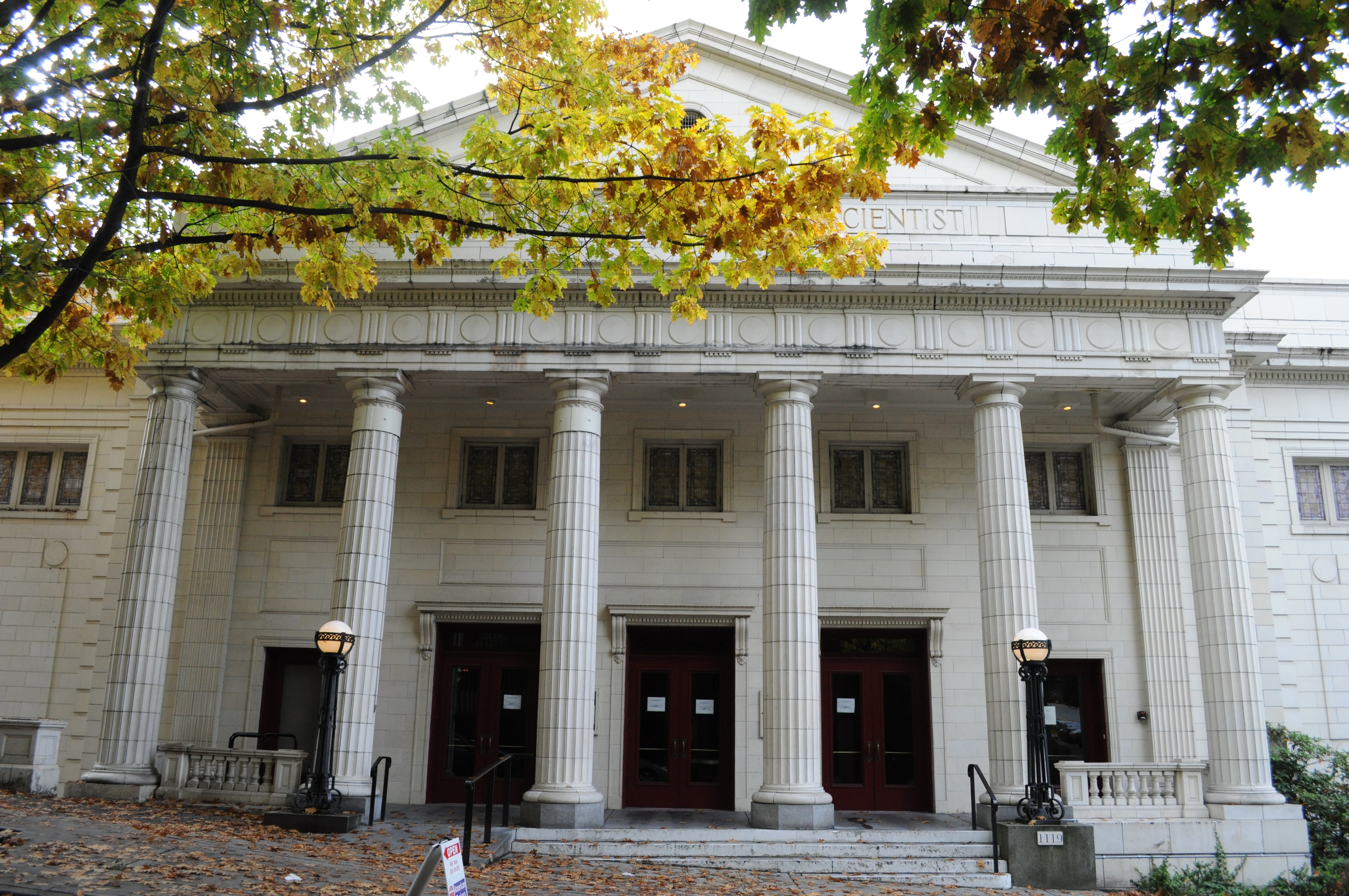

- Location within Downtown Seattle
- Location: 1119 8th Ave., Seattle, Washington
- Coordinates: 47°36′32″N 122°19′48″W
- Area: 0.3 acres (0.12 ha)
- Built: 1916-22
- Built by: Neil McDonald, contractor
- Architect: George Foote Dunham
- Architectural style: Classical Revival
- NRHP reference No.: 12001138

Significant dates
- Added to NRHP: January 2, 2013
- Designated SEATL: November 2012

Town Hall Seattle, or Town Hall locally, is a cultural center and performance hall located on Seattle, Washington, USA's First Hill at 1119 8th Ave. Built as Fourth Church of Christ, Scientist, Seattle, a Church of Christ, Scientist church, from 1916 to 1922, it was sold by the church to its current owners in 1998 and reopened in 1999. In 2017, Town Hall announced they raised $20 million for a "top-to-bottom" renovation. In January 2019, they announced construction issues delayed their planned reopening. Town Hall officially completed construction and reopened its doors to the public on May 16, 2019.

It was designated a Seattle Landmark in 2012 and was listed on the National Register of Historic Places as "Fourth Church of Christ, Scientist" in 2013.
