= Seattle Weekly =

American Alternative biweekly newspaper based in Seattle, Washington

- Type: Alternative weekly
- Format: Tabloid
- Owner: Sound Publishing
- Founders: Darrell Oldham; David Brewster
- Editor: Andy Hobbs
- Staff writers: Cameron Sheppard
- Founded: 1976
- Headquarters: 307 Third Avenue South; Seattle, Washington
- Circulation: formerly 38,000 (web-only since 2019)
- ISSN: 0898-0845
- OCLC number: 17527271
- Website: seattleweekly.com

The Seattle Weekly is an alternative biweekly newspaper in Seattle, Washington, United States. It was founded by Darrell Oldham and David Brewster as The Weekly. Its first issue was published on March 31, 1976, and it became a web-only publication on March 1, 2019. Since January 2013, it has been owned by Sound Publishing, Inc., a subsidiary of the Canadian company Black Press and the largest community news publisher in Washington State. It is published each Wednesday.

== Ownership history ==
Former owners of the Seattle Weekly include Sasquatch Publishing/Quickfish Media, Seattle from 1976 to 1997; Stern Publishing, New York, from 1997 to 2000; Village Voice Media, New York, from 2000 to 2012; and Voice Media Group from September 2012 to January 2013. Village Voice Media executives Scott Tobias, Christine Brennan and Jeff Mars bought Village Voice Media's papers and associated web properties from its founders to form Voice Media Group. Sound Publishing purchased the Seattle Weekly from Voice Media Group in January 2013.

In July 2006, longtime editor-in-chief Knute Berger announced he would be leaving the paper.

Mark Baumgarten, former City Arts editor-in-chief and author of Love Rock Revolution, became editor-in-chief on March 12, 2013, replacing Mike Seely who resigned January of the same year. In January 2018, Seth Sommerfeld became editor-in-chief and Mark Baumgarten transitioned to editorial director for King County. In June 2018, Andy Hobbs replaced Baumgarten as editorial director, and in August 2018, he became editor-in-chief.

Eric LaFontaine was named publisher in May 2018 and was put in change of all digital and print operations.

On February 25, 2019, Sound Publishing announced that the paper would transition to web-only content in a move similar to the Seattle Post-Intelligencer a decade earlier. The final print edition was published on February 27, 2019, and the web-only portal was launched two days later.

== Columns ==
- Mossback, by Knute Berger as editor-in-chief
- Ask an Uptight Seattlite, advice by David Stoesz
- Dategirl, by Judy McGuire
- Seattleland, by Rick Anderson
- Space Witch, astrology by Elissa Ball
- Stash Box, cannabis culture by Meagan Angus
- Beer Hunting, beer by Jacob Uitti
- Constant Reader, literature by Paul Constant
- Electric Eye, by Brooklyn Benjestorf (2015–2016)

== Competition ==
The Seattle Weekly's principal competitor is The Stranger, an alternative biweekly paper published in Seattle.
