= Lincoln County Leader (1893–1987) =

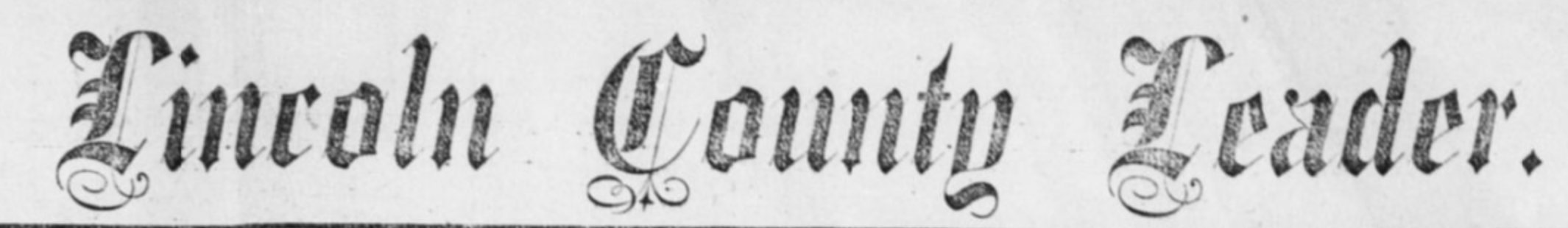
- Type: Weekly newspaper
- Founder: John F. Stewart
- Founded: March 9, 1893
- Ceased publication: 1987
- Language: English
- City: Toledo, Oregon
- Country: United States
- Circulation: 2,700 (as of 1975)
- ISSN: 0892-3353
- OCLC number: 11702954
- Free online archives: "Lincoln County Leader". Chronicling America: Historic American Newspapers. Library of Congress.; "Lincoln County Leader". Historic American Newspapers. University of Oregon.

The Lincoln County Leader was a weekly American newspaper published in Toledo, Oregon from 1893 to 1987. The newspaper was originally published as a Democratic paper, but its party affiliation changed with the ownership. For many years the newspaper was the primary journal in Lincoln County.

In 2024, Country Media, Inc. resurrected the name when it combined the Newport News Times and The News Guard to be the Lincoln County Leader newspaper that serves Lincoln County, Oregon.

== History ==
The first publisher of the Lincoln County Leader was John F. Stewart.(c. 1865–1917). The paper was originally published every Thursday. Subscription rates for three months were 50 cents, 75 cents for six months, and $1.50 for a year.

In 1893, Stewart had moved to Toledo, Oregon from Woodburn, a town in the Willamette Valley, where he had been publishing a paper called the World, which was operating in competition with the Independent. Stewart's plan was to start a new newspaper in a town without competition. Toledo seemed promising, as it was then the county seat of Lincoln County, and a rail terminus.

The first issue, Volume 1, Number 1, was published on March 9, 1893. The original printing press was small, consisting of an "army" model, which was placed upon a dry goods box. It was slow, producing one page at a time. Type was handset on a "kid" typesetter. Under Stewart, the Leader supported the Democratic Party as well as the right to vote of Native Americans living on the Siletz Indian reservation.

Stewart became the county judge of Lincoln County in 1898.

The Leader was originally a Democratic paper, and remained so for over four years while it was under the ownership of John F. Stewart.

Stewart then sold the newspaper to Wesley L. Davis. Davis was a Republican, and as such he changed the editorial leanings of the paper. In 1893, Davis had been the publisher of the Silverton Tribune. However, less than a year after he bought the Leader, Davis sold the paper to Robert E. Collins.

Collins in turn only held the paper for a few months before selling it to Charles F. and Ada E. Soule. The Soules were Republicans, and often criticized William Jennings Bryan, a leading national Democrat at the time. The first issued under the Soules was published on Friday, September 15, 1899. The Soules also consolidated the operations of the Leader with another newspaper, the Toledo Tug, with the Tug losing its identity.

On September 1, 1907, the paper came back into the control of Robert E. Collins. Collins continued the Republican affiliation of the paper which it had assumed since the sale by Stewart.

On June 14, 1915, a new weekly newspaper, the Independent Enterprise, would begin publication in Newport, Oregon. The type for the new paper was set on a linotype machine owned by the Lincoln County Leader. With the addition of the Independent Enterprise, which was published in Nye Creek by Cecil J. Emery, there were then three weekly newspapers published in Newport, then a town of less than 1,000 population. The other newspapers were the Yaquina Bay News, which had been published by William Mathews since 1890, and the Newport Signal, published by John Fleming Wilson since 1907.

== Sale to the Hall brothers ==
Collins had a partner, Fern Hayden, and together they published the Leader until 1922 when they sold it to the Hall brothers. Willoughby Hall then became the editor.

Later editors of the Leader, up to 1939, included R.H. Howell and John E. Cooter, speaker of the Oregon House of Representatives in the 1935 regular legislative session.

After the 1927 purchase, John E. Cooter became publisher and R.H. Howell became editor and manager. Soon afterwards R.H. Howell and his wife Edith Howell bought out the other stockholders. R.H. Howell had been active in Toledo affairs for a number of years, which included several years service as the superintendent of schools. For six years R.H. Howell was mayor of Toledo.

A few years after the 1922 sale of the Leader to the Halls, Collins established a competing journal, the Lincoln County Herald. In 1927, a corporation bought both newspapers and merged them under the title of the Lincoln County Leader.

In early November, 1933, the building which had originally housed the Leader in 1893 was demolished. According to the Portland Oregonian, for nearly 35 of those years, the building had been "a meeting place for many of the county's leading politicians and newspapermen during its time, and many of statewide fame."

R.H. Howell died in October 1937. After his death Edith Howell took over management of the Leader.

== Post-war years ==
From 1945 to 1948, the Leader was published by Milton H. Jones (c. 1896–1958).

In 1951, Elmer Price was editor of the Leader. Price published articles critical of local law enforcement. In early November 1951, Price was summoned by the Lincoln County grand jury and questioned about his sources for articles on local vice operations of the police. In October 1951, Price published a black-bordered editorial "mourning the death of 'official integrity and responsibility'". The occasion for this was that publication of the expenditures of Lincoln County had been suspended for one year.

As of July 1960, the Leader was printed by the offset method. Offset printing was a process based upon lithography. It was different from letter press printing, and it eliminated the stereotyping process.

In February 1967, Lee Irwin was the co-publisher of the Lincoln County Leader, as well as three other newspapers in Oregon, the Gresham Outlook, the Sandy Post, and the Newport News.

== Last years of publication ==
In July 1974, the Lincoln County Leader was jointly owned by Walter Taylor, of Newport, and Lee Irwin, of Gresham. At that time Irwin and Taylor were also co-owners, with David Juenke, of other newspapers, including the then-recently acquired weekly Seaside Signal (circulation: 3,200) and the Tillamook Headlight Herald. Irwin and Taylor also owned the Newport News-Times, the Gresham Outlook, and the Sandy Post.

In 1975 the Lincoln County Leader won an award from the Oregon Newspaper Publishers Association for general excellence for newspapers published weekly. The newspaper's circulation at that time was 2,700.

Taylor and Irwin sold the newspaper in 1977 to the Democrat-Herald Publishing Co., which published the Albany Democrat-Herald. Capital Cities purchased the company in 1980. The Leader remained in operation until 1987.
