= 1962 Oregon Ballot Measure 9 =

Ballot Measure 9
- November 6, 1962
- Legislative Apportionment Constitutional Amendment

Results
Choice	Votes	%
Yes	197,322	37.76%
No	325,182	62.24%
- County results Yes: 50–60% 60–70% 70–80% No: 50–60% 60–70% 70–80%

Measure 9 was a ballot initiative concerning state legislative redistricting in the State of Oregon held on November 6, 1962. If ratified, it would have amended the Constitution of Oregon establish a new process for reapportioning the Oregon State Legislature effective after the 1970 U.S. Census, as well as introducing a new temporary plan. The Senate reapportionment process would have been largely left alone, but the apportionment of the state house would have been highly modified, creating a frozen 30-district map that representatives would be apportioned to.

A leading criticism of the proposed plan was that the apportionment formula used would have widened the population disparity between urban and rural districts, while proponents argued that the new formula would make the representative distribution more fair to rural areas, especially to Eastern Oregon. The measure was rejected by a 25-point margin.

== Amendment ==
If ratified, the Measure 9 would have:

- Repealed Sections 2 and 6 of Article IV of the Constitution of Oregon, which concerned the number and apportionment of state senators and representatives.
- Established a minimum of 65 seats in the Oregon House of Representatives, up from its current number of 60, allotted among permanent, constitutionally-defined House districts in a multi-step process, with each receiving at least one representative. The boundaries of House districts would not have been changed following decennial censuses.
  - After each census, representatives would have been apportioned to the districts based on their population.
  - Then, if a population per representative number of a district exceeded four times that of that of the district with the smallest such number, it would receive an additional representative.
- Established a minimum of 30 seats in the Oregon State Senate, its current number, with the Legislature permitted to increase the size of the Senate up to 35. The formula for apportionment would have remained "substantially unchanged."
- The amendment would have become operative on Election Day, and for the purposes of nominating legislative candidates prior to Election Day.

The official explanatory statement of the measure stated that "the probable effect of this amendment will be to give somewhat more emphasis in the House of Representatives to representation from sparsely settled counties and to make some Representative Districts not so large in area as is now the case."

=== Temporary apportionment ===
==== House of Representatives ====
Population balance of the House as set by this measure

District	County	1960 Population	Seats	People per seat
1	Clatsop	27,380	1	27,380
2	Columbia	22,379	1	22,379
3	Tillamook	18,955	1	18,955
4	Washington	92,237	3	30,746
5	Yamhill	32,478	1	32,478
6	Multnomah	522,813	17	30,754
7	Clackamas	113,038	4	28,260
8	Lincoln	24,635	1	24,635
9	Polk	26,523	1	26,523
10	Benton	39,165	1	39,165
11	Marion	120,888	4	30,222
12	Linn	58,867	2	29,434
13	Lane	162,890	5	32,578
14	Douglas	68,458	2	34,229
15	Coos	54,955	2	27,478
16	Curry	13,983	1	13,983
17	Josephine	29,917	1	29,917
18	Jackson	73,962	3	24,654
19	Hood River	13,395	1	13,395
20	Wasco	20,205	1	20,205
21	Sherman, Gilliam, Morrow	10,386	1	10,386
22	Umatilla	44,352	2	22,176
23	Union, Wallowa	25,282	1	25,282
24	Jefferson, Crook	16,560	1	16,560
25	Baker	17,295	1	17,295
26	Deschutes	23,100	1	23,100
27	Lake, Harney	13,902	1	13,902
28	Wheeler, Grant	10,448	1	10,448
29	Malheur	22,764	1	22,764
30	Klamath	47,475	2	23,738
AVERAGE				27,211

== Endorsements ==
For

Leading campaign

- Citizens Committee For Representative Government

Newspapers

- Herald and News
- The Capital Journal
- Corvallis Gazette-Times
- The Lebanon Express
- The Observer
- The Bulletin
Against

Leading campaign

- Bipartisan Committee to Retain Equal Representation

Organizations

- Oregon AFL–CIO
- Oregon League of Women Voters

Newspapers

- Capital Press
- The Oregonian
- The Register-Guard
- The World

== Results ==
Voters in Oregon soundly rejected the measure by a margin of 127,827 votes, or nearly 25 percentage points. Counties west of the Oregon Cascades broadly rejected the amendment, while counties east of the Cascades broadly supported it.

1962 Oregon Ballot Measure 9
Choice	Votes	%
For	197,322	37.76
Against	325,182	62.24
Total	522,504	100.00

=== Results by county ===
County	For		Against		Margin		Total
County	#	%	#	%	#	%	Total
Baker	2,671	60.36%	1,754	39.64%	917	20.72%	4,425
Benton	4,597	42.95%	6,105	57.05%	−1,508	−14.09%	10,702
Clackamas	12,161	31.72%	26,178	68.28%	−14,017	−36.56%	38,339
Clatsop	2,983	36.72%	5,141	63.28%	−2,158	−26.56%	8,124
Columbia	2,072	30.81%	4,652	69.19%	−2,580	−38.37%	6,724
Coos	4,222	29.88%	9,906	70.12%	−5,684	−40.23%	14,128
Crook	1,281	55.87%	1,012	44.13%	269	11.73%	2,293
Curry	1,364	43.34%	1,783	56.66%	−419	−13.31%	3,147
Deschutes	4,293	65.51%	2,260	34.49%	2,033	31.02%	6,553
Douglas	9,431	57.06%	7,097	42.94%	2,334	14.12%	16,528
Gilliam	729	73.79%	259	26.21%	470	47.57%	988
Grant	1,170	66.52%	589	33.48%	581	33.03%	1,759
Harney	1,218	64.27%	677	35.73%	541	28.55%	1,895
Hood River	2,356	62.33%	1,424	37.67%	932	24.66%	3,780
Jackson	11,532	54.55%	9,608	45.45%	1,924	9.10%	21,140
Jefferson	1,308	68.09%	613	31.91%	695	36.18%	1,921
Josephine	5,232	60.68%	3,390	39.32%	1,842	21.36%	8,622
Klamath	7,649	66.33%	3,882	33.67%	3,767	32.67%	11,531
Lake	895	58.12%	645	41.88%	250	16.23%	1,540
Lane	14,102	29.00%	34,224	70.38%	−20,122	−41.38%	48,626
Lincoln	2,342	34.81%	4,386	65.19%	−2,044	−30.38%	6,728
Linn	5,012	31.74%	10,780	68.26%	−5,768	−36.52%	15,792
Malheur	4,322	76.70%	1,313	23.30%	3,009	53.40%	5,635
Marion	10,538	31.15%	23,296	68.85%	−12,758	−37.71%	33,834
Morrow	1,033	73.84%	366	26.16%	667	47.68%	1,399
Multnomah	47,381	28.33%	119,881	71.67%	−72,500	−43.35%	167,262
Polk	2,743	34.58%	5,190	65.42%	−2,447	−30.85%	7,933
Sherman	521	63.93%	294	36.07%	227	27.85%	815
Tillamook	2,090	38.20%	3,381	61.80%	−1,291	−23.60%	5,471
Umatilla	7,463	67.89%	3,530	32.11%	3,933	35.78%	10,993
Union	3,092	59.00%	2,149	41.00%	943	17.99%	5,241
Wallowa	947	52.41%	860	47.59%	87	4.81%	1,807
Wasco	3,006	53.98%	2,563	46.02%	443	7.95%	5,569
Washington	10,575	33.52%	20,975	66.48%	−10,400	−32.96%	31,550
Wheeler	286	52.29%	261	47.71%	25	4.57%	547
Yamhill	4,705	49.72%	4,758	50.28%	−53	−0.56%	9,463

== See also ==
- 1962 Oregon Ballot Measure 1
