= Coquille Valley Sentinel =

Weekly newspaper published in Coquille, Oregon

- 2026 front page
- Type: Weekly newspaper
- Founder: Orville Ovando Dodge
- Publisher: Matt Hall
- Founded: 1905
- Language: English
- Headquarters: 408 Spruce Street; Myrtle Point, Oregon
- City: Coquille, Oregon
- Website: coquillevalleysentinelnews.com

The Coquille Valley Sentinel is a weekly newspaper in Coquille, Oregon.

== History ==
In 1905, Orville Ovando Dodge founded the Coquille Valley Sentinel. He retired in September 1907 and leased the paper to H.J. Crippen for a year. J.C. Savage then edited and managed the Sentinel. In October 1909, he acquired it from Dodge.

In January 1913, Lew A. Cates, formerly editor of the Cottage Grove Sentinel, purchased the Sentinel from Savage. In January 1914, Henry W. Young acquired an interest in the paper from Cates. Young acquired the Coquille Herald and merged it into the Sentinel in September 1917.

Young died in January 1927. At that time ownership was passed to his son H. Allen Young and daughter Marion D. Grimes. Due to failing health, Young sold his half-interest to Ralph P. Stuller in October 1945. He and his wife eventually acquired full ownership and published the paper for 16 years until March 1961, when it was sold to Fred Haas, owner of the North Bend News. At that time the Sentinel had a circulation around 2,300.

In May 1978, Robert and Betty Van Leer, owners of the Curry County Reporter, acquired the Sentinel from Haas. In October 1979, the Sentinel, along with the Bandon Western World, were acquired by Jim and Carolyn Gill, Robert Cribbs and Wright. In 2013, Matt and Kim Hall, owners of the Port Orford News and Myrtle Point Herald, acquired the Sentinel from Jean Ivey.
