= North Coast Citizen =

Biweekly newspaper published in Manzanita, Oregon

- Type: Biweekly newspaper
- Format: Broadsheet
- Owner: Country Media, Inc.
- Founder: Dave Dillon
- Editor: Will Chappell
- Founded: 1996
- Ceased publication: 2026
- Language: English
- Headquarters: 1906 2nd St, Tillamook, OR 97141
- Sister newspapers: Tillamook Headlight-Herald
- ISSN: 1550-3909
- OCLC number: 35551857
- Website: northcoastcitizen.com

The North Coast Citizen was a biweekly newspaper in Manzanita, Oregon. It was published from 1995 to 2026.

== History ==
In late 1995, about 30 people attended a community meeting organized Judd Burrow at his Arbors Bed and Breakfast. The group met to discuss a lack of news coverage from the Tillamook Headlight-Herald on the communities of Manzanita, Nehalem and Wheeler. Burrow proposed the creation of a newspaper for people living in north Tillamook County.

After that meeting, ten people helped create the first edition of the North Coast Citizen, which was published in April 1996. By then only six people were still involved in the paper. Dave Dillon served as the paper's first editor due to his writing experience. In 2003, Dillon sold the newspaper to Tom Mauldin and Cat Mauldin, who owned the Cannon Beach Gazette.

A year later the paper was sold again to Jan and Dave Fisher. The couple ran it for three years until selling it in July 2007 to East Oregonian Publishing Company (now EO Media Group). Two years later the newspaper was expanded from tabloid size to broadsheet. In June 2011, the company sold the paper to Country Media, Inc. In February 2026, the Citizen ceased due to dwindling advertising revenue.
