= The Malibu Times =

Newspaper in Malibu, California

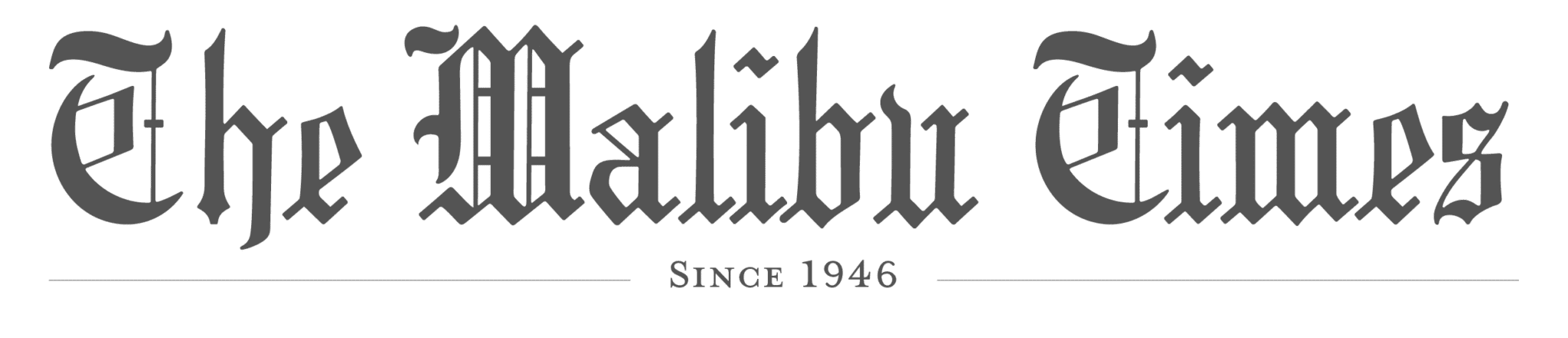
- Owner: 13 Stars
- Founder: Reeves D. Templeman
- Publisher: Hayley Mattson
- Founded: 1946
- Language: English
- Headquarters: 24955 Pacific Coast Highway, Suite A102, Malibu, California 90265
- City: Malibu, California
- Website: malibutimes.com

The Malibu Times is the local newspaper in Malibu, California.

== History ==
In 1946, Reeves D. Templeman founded The Malibu Times. Templeman was assisted by his wife, Reta Templeman. In 1987, Arnold and Karen York purchased the Times from the Templeman family. In 2021, the Yorks sold Times newspaper and magazine to Nicholas and Hayley Mattson, owners of the Paso Robles Press and Atascadero News.
