= Albany Democrat-Herald =

Daily newspaper published in Albany, Oregon

- Type: Daily newspaper
- Format: Broadsheet
- Owner: Lee Enterprises
- Publisher: Matt Sandberg
- Editor: Penny Rosenberg
- Founded: 1865 (as the State Rights Democrat)
- Language: English
- Headquarters: 600 Lyon St. SW; Albany, OR 97321; United States
- Circulation: 6,243 Daily (as of 2023)
- Sister newspapers: Corvallis Gazette-Times
- OCLC number: 23859817
- Website: democratherald.com

The Albany Democrat-Herald is a daily newspaper published in Albany, Oregon, United States. The paper is owned by the Iowa-based Lee Enterprises, a firm which also owns the daily Corvallis Gazette-Times, an identical publication with an alternate banner published in the adjacent market of Corvallis, Oregon, as well as two weeklies, the Lebanon Express and the Philomath Express. The two daily papers publish a joint Sunday edition, called Mid-Valley Sunday.

The Democrat-Herald covers the cities of Albany, Lebanon, and Sweet Home, Oregon, as well as the towns of Jefferson, Halsey, Tangent, Harrisburg, Brownsville, and Shedd.

== History ==
=== Forerunners ===
The first newspaper published in Albany, Oregon, county seat of Linn County, was the Oregon Democrat, launched by US Senator Delazon Smith on November 1, 1859. A dedicated supporter of the pro-slavery Democratic Party, Smith's publication was largely devoted to fierce partisan polemics with the editor of the rival Republican publication, the Oregon Statesman, published by the indefatigable Asahel Bush in the nearby city of Salem.

Founding publisher Smith died in November 1860, on the eve of the American Civil War. The Oregon Democrat was carried forward by a new publisher, Pat Malone, but the Confederate-sympathizing weekly ran into trouble with the Republican keepers of the postal system and on April 30, 1862, the paper was banned from the US Mail for its political line. Editor Malone attempted to avoid the postal ban with a remade publication called the Albany Inquirer, but that paper was likewise banned from the mails, thereby effectively terminating the publication.

=== Origins ===
It was not until the summer of 1865 that a Democratic newspaper was able to be reestablished in Albany. This was a weekly called the State Rights Democrat, launched on August 1, 1865, by publisher James O'Meara. It is this publication — issued continuously from 1865 into the 21st Century — to which the Albany Democrat-Herald itself traces its roots.

The State Rights Democrat existed as a weekly publication for 17 years, until the paper was sold in 1882 to a new publisher, Fred Nutting, who placed his mark on the broadsheet with a new title, the Albany Weekly Democrat. This name remained in place for six years, until the 1888 move of the paper from a weekly to a daily publication schedule, with the paper becoming the Albany Democrat effective with the change.

In 1879, a rival Republican newspaper was launched in Albany by William Gladstone Steel, the Albany Herald. The dual partisan newspapers battled for market share for nearly half a century until on February 24, 1925, the dominant Albany Democrat absorbed its younger rival. For about six weeks the title Albany Democrat & Albany Herald was clumsily used, with a change made to the current moniker, Albany Democrat-Herald, in the middle of April 1925.

=== Ownership changes ===
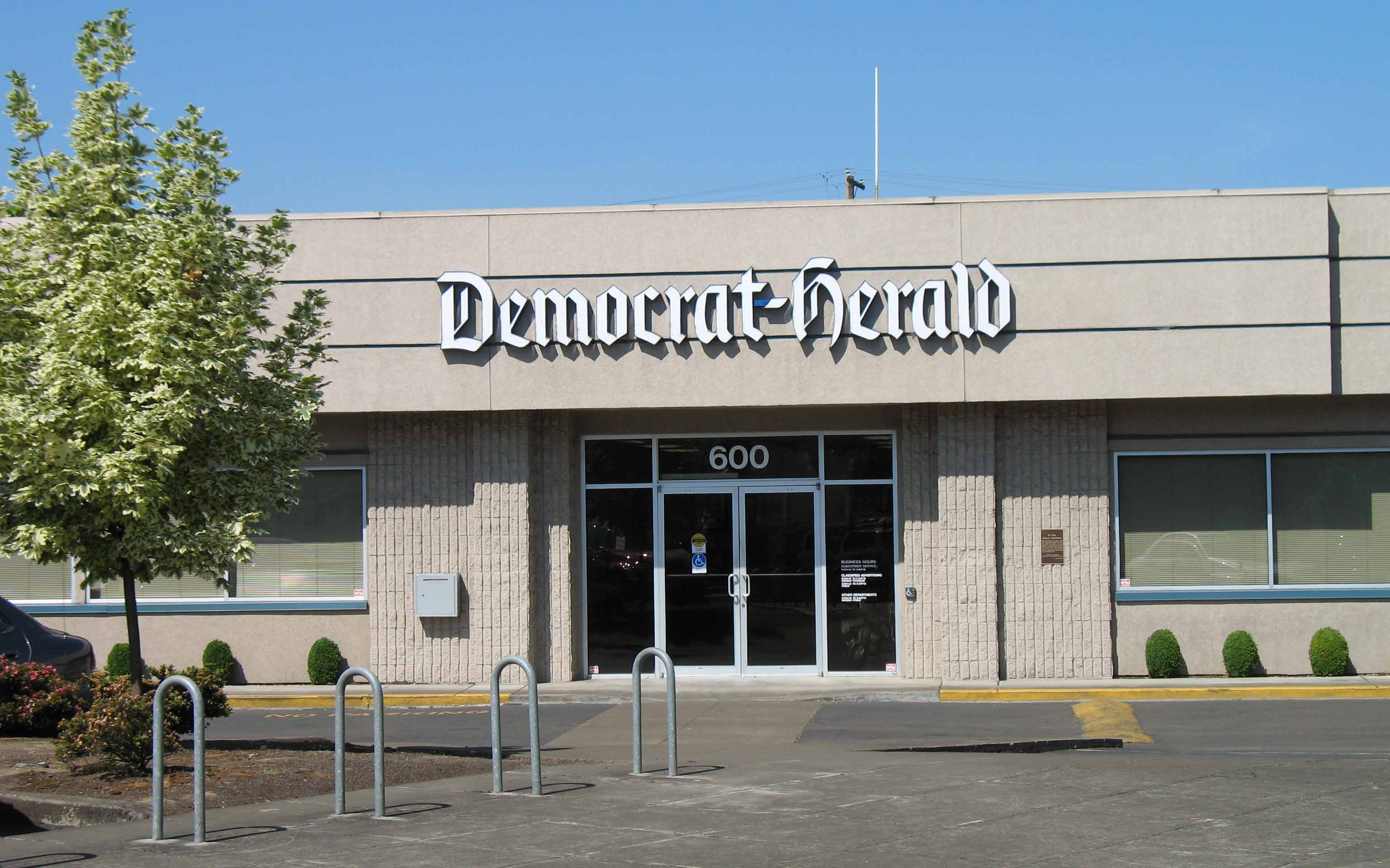
Offices of the Albany Democrat-Herald, located downtown on Lyon Street.

The Democrat-Herald was privately owned by individuals for most of the 20th Century. In 1919 the Albany Democrat was purchased by local school superintendent William L. Jackson and his business partner, Ralph R. Cronise. It would be this pair who owned the merged publication from its establishment in 1925.

Jackson died on Feb. 14, 1949, and his stake in the paper's ownership was inherited by his son Grant Jackson. At that time Cronise was left as the paper's sole editor and publisher. He managed the Democrat-Herald until selling his shares to Elmo Smith in 1957. Under Smith's leadership, the Democrat-Herald Publishing Co. purchased the Cottage Grove Sentinel in 1961. Smith died in 1968.

In 1970, the company purchased the Lebanon Express from Robert Hayden and the Ashland Daily Tidings from Edd Rountree. It also purchased the Western Stamp Collector Newspaper in 1976, along with four weekly papers in 1977 (Gresham Outlook, Sandy Post, Newport News Times and Lincoln County Leader).

The Democrat-Herald moved from individual to corporate ownership when media giant Capital Cities purchased 25% of Democrat-Herald Publishing Co. sometime in the late 1970s. The company acquired the remaining 75% from the heirs of Glenn Jackson after he died in 1980. So-called CapCities would purchase the American Broadcasting Company (ABC) in 1985, only to themselves be acquired in 1996 by the Walt Disney Company. Disney immediately began to divest itself of the newspapers acquired in the merger, with the Democrat-Herald sold to Lee Enterprises of Davenport, Iowa in 1998 — a media company which already owned the Corvallis Gazette-Times, located approximately 10 miles away.

== Schedule and circulation ==
Having always been an afternoon newspaper on weekdays with a delivery deadline of 5:30 P.M., on October 4, 2010, it became a morning paper every day with a deadline of 6:30 A.M. on weekdays and 7:00 A.M. on weekends.

As of 2016, the Democrat-Herald has a daily circulation of about 7,500. The combined Sunday edition has a circulation of approximately 8,000.

Starting June 27, 2023, the print edition of the Democrat-Herald will be reduced to three days a week: Tuesday, Thursday and Saturday. Also, the newspaper will transition from being delivered by a traditional newspaper delivery carrier to mail delivery by the U.S. Postal Service.
