= Myrtle Point Herald =

Weekly newspaper published in Myrtle Point, Oregon

- Type: Weekly newspaper
- Owner(s): Matt and Kim Hall
- Founder: W.L. Dixon
- Founded: 1889 (as the West Oregonian)
- Language: English
- Headquarters: 408 Spruce St, Myrtle Point, OR 97458
- Sister newspapers: Curry County Reporter; Port Orford News
- OCLC number: 43191122
- Website: myrtlepointherald.com

The Myrtle Point Herald is a weekly newspaper in Myrtle Point, Oregon.

== History ==
Myrtle Point's first newspaper was called the West Oregonian. The name was mocked at the time as The Oregonian of Portland and East Oregonian of Pendleton were already in circulation. The West Oregonian was founded as a Republican paper. The owner was merchant W.L. Dixon, who served was publisher, with Orval Dodge as editor and Dr. J. J. Gussenhoven as the business manager. It was printed by Washington hand press and first published on Dec. 3, 1889. The press was delivered by steam schooner from San Francisco to Bandon, then by river boat into town. At the time Myrtle Point had 300 residents who all came out to see the press delivered to its new home.

After experiencing early financial difficulties, a group of local merchants called The Board of Trade of Myrtle Point bought the paper and installed Dodge as publisher/editor. The next owner was John H. Roberts, followed by Dodge, then attorney W. O. Philips, who failed and returned the paper to Roberts. After many changes in management and location, the plant was eventually sold off. The paper officially ceased sometime in August 1895.

Myrtle Point was without a newspaper for a time. But E. P. Thorp and W. C. Conner saw an opportunity. The duo published the Riddle Enterprise in Riddle for two years before deciding to move their plant to Myrtle Point to launch the Myrtle Point Enterprise on November 16, 1895. Conner operated the paper for four years until selling it to G. M. Short and J. C. Roberts. In October 1901, E. C. Roberts acquired Short's interest, and sold it in May 1905 to L. J. Roberts.

In 1909, L. C. Bargelt bought out Roberts, later selling his stake to C. M. Schultz. In 1917, Schultz sold the Enterprise to W. R. Smith, who then immediately changed the name to the Southern Coos County American out of patriotic fervor inspired by World War I. In 1923, J. M. Bledsoe bought the paper from Smith, who then sold it in George E. Hamilton about two years later. Hamilton soon renamed the paper to the Myrtle Point Herald because he disliked the long name, feeling it gave subscribers writer's cramp writing it across checks. Hamilton put the paper into its own building for the first time. He sold it in 1932 to father and son R. L. and J. L. Tucker.

After Tucker died, his widow sold the paper in 1940 to Arthur R. Jones. Jones was a Presbyterian minister who previously published papers in John Day, Prineville and Condon. In 1947, Jones sold the paper to Logan White. In 1948, Elbert Floyd Hall, who a year prior sold the Canby Herald, and his brother George Hall of Tampa, Florida, purchased the Herald from White. Elbert Hall worked as the business manager and George Hall as the paper's editor. In 1953, a defective oil burner conversion unit caught the Herald's office and printing plant on fire. Ten tons of newsprint was destroyed but important machinery were not affected. Damages were estimated at $4,000.

In 1960, Elbert F. "Al" Hall bought out his uncle George Hall and became the Herald's new publisher. In 1961, his father E. F. Hall died, leaving Al Hall as sole owner. In 1968, Hall sold the Herald to C.D. "Dave" Holman Jr., owner of the Siuslaw News and the Creswell Chronicle. The following owners were Jack Gautney and Laura Isenhardt. In 2013, Matt and Kim Hall purchased the Herald. At the time, the Halls also owned the Port Orford News and soon acquired the Coquille Valley Sentinel.
