= Polk County Itemizer-Observer =

Weekly newspaper published in Dallas, Oregon

- Type: Weekly newspaper
- Format: Broadsheet
- Owner(s): Country Media, Inc.
- Founder(s): J. H. Upton
- Editor: David Hayes
- Founded: 1868 (as Polk County Signal)
- Language: English
- Headquarters: Dallas, Oregon
- Circulation: 3,550
- Website: polkio.com

The Polk County Itemizer-Observer is a weekly newspaper published in Dallas, Oregon, United States, and covering Dallas, Monmouth, Independence, Falls City and the surrounding area. It was established in 1875. The Itemizer-Observer is published on Wednesdays and its circulation is 3,550. It is the newspaper of record for Polk County.

== History ==
=== Dallas Itemizer ===
In 1868, J. H. Upton founded the Polk County Signal in Dallas. It was political newspaper created to support Democrat candidate Joseph Showalter Smith who was running against David Logan for a seat in the United States House of Representatives. The Signal was a four-page seven-column paper published on Mondays. An annual subscription cost $3. It ceased in March 1869. The paper's office space was bought by Frank Stuart who started a new title called the Polk County Times. He sold the paper to D. M. C. Gault who in March 1970 relaunched it as the Oregon Republican. About a year later R. H. Tyson became editor and publisher. At that time the paper claimed a 500 circulation. In 1872, Tyson sold the paper to P. C. Sullivan, who renamed it to the Liberal Republican in support of Horace Greeley and his Liberal Republican Party. Henry Sullivan and A. R. Lyle were the paper's next owners followed by Reese Clark. Casey and Hammond purchased the Republican in August 1874 and renamed it to the Dallas Itemizer. Casey bought out his partner and then sold the paper to Walter Williams and George E. Good. Up until then the paper used a Washington hand-press when Good installed a power press. In 1883, Good sold the paper to Rev. J. S. McCain, who later that year sold the paper to V. P. Fiske, followed by Graham Glass Jr. and Mr. Prudhomme in 1885 and W. A. Wash in June 1888. Fiske repurchased the Itemizer from Wash in 1906. M. L. Boyd with E. Bloom leased the paper in 1914. Bloom dropped out after three years and Boyd operated the paper for the remainder of Fiske's ownership.

=== Polk County Observer ===
In 1888, Charles C. Doughty and George Snyder started the Polk County Observer. The paper was originally in Monmouth but later moved to Dallas. Doughty became the sole owner after a few months. Carey Hayter became a co-owner in 1892. Hayter bought out Doughty in 1899. He leased the paper to Jack Allgood and Dean Collins in 1910. A year later the Observer was sold to Eugene Foster and William Totten. Foster later died and Totten sold out to Gerald Volk and H. Parsell in 1914. Parsell was later bought out by Volk. He sold the Observer a few months later to Lew A. Cates, former publisher of the Cottage Grove Sentinel. Two years later Cates sold the paper to H. W. Brune. He returned it to Cates in 1917 to enlist in the army during World War I. E. E. Southard then purchased the paper, and Cates had it back after a few months. E. A. Koen bought the paper in 1919. The Observer plant was destroyed by fire in April 1921, but Koen never missed an issue. Earle Richardson became the owner on March 1, 1924.

=== Polk County Itemizer-Observer ===
In 1927, Fiske sold the Dallas Itemizer to Earle Richardson, who then merged it with the Polk County Observer to form the Polk County Itemizer-Observer. Richardson published the paper until selling it to Eagle Newspapers in 1964. On November 11, 1970, a gas leak ignited in the newspaper's office and caused an explosion. Mechanical equipment including two offset presses valued at $175,000 were destroyed in the blast. The paper's total losses, covered by insurance, were estimated to be up to $500,000. No one was injured. In 1992, the Itemizer-Observer (circulation 5,200) absorbed the Sun-Enterprise (circulation 2,400) of Independence and Monmouth, both owned by Eagle Newspapers. The Sun-Enterprise was formed in 1975 after the merger of the Polk Sun and Enterprise Herald. In March 2020, Eagle sold the Itemizer-Observer to Scott Olson. The newspaper was sold again in October 2023 to Country Media, Inc.
