= Port Orford News =

Weekly newspaper published in Port Orford, Oregon

- Type: Weekly newspaper
- Owner(s): Matt and Kim Hall
- Founder: George W. Soranson
- Founded: 1926
- Language: English
- Headquarters: PO Box 5, Port Orford, OR
- Circulation: 900
- Sister newspapers: Curry County Reporter; Myrtle Point Herald
- ISSN: 3066-3741
- OCLC number: 44951803
- Website: portorfordnews.net

The Port Orford News is a weekly newspaper published in Port Orford on the coast of the U.S. state of Oregon since 1926.

== History ==
The Port Orford News was established by George W. Soranson in 1926. The newspaper has been credited with promoting the development of Port Orford and decades later was described as "a wide-awake, progressive influence in the community." Soranson was widely known for his work helping to preserve the historic Battle Rock, which became part of a state park. He published the paper until his death in 1933.

Frank Fay Eddy launched another paper called the Port Orford Post in 1937, but he died three years later.

Around 1955, Paul L. Peterson opened a print shop called Port Orford Press. Four years later he relaunched the Port Orford News, the town's first newspaper in nearly two decades. Peterson sold the business in 1961 to Louis D. Felsheim, co-publisher of the Bandon Western World. He died a year later and the two papers were inherited by his son Louis L. Felsheim. In 1973, L. L. Felsheim sold the Western World and continued to publish the News. In 1984, L.D. Felsheim was inducted into the Oregon Newspaper Hall of Fame.

In 2003, WillowSong Hall acquired the paper. In 2005, editor Matt Hall went to New Orleans to help with Hurricane Katrina relief efforts. In September 2006, Portland-based Beacon Communication, owned by Erik Jonsson, bought the News from the Halls. That November, Jonsson bought the Coquille Valley Sentinel from Hall and started the Springfield Beacon. He soon acquired the Roseburg Beacon and North County News. In 2008, the Beacon ceased. By 2012, the Halls were again the News owners; in that year, they acquired the Curry County Reporter. In 2013, the couple bought the Myrtle Point Herald, and the Coquille Valley Sentinel.

== Archive ==
The University of Oregon Library has archives of the News. Current issues of the newspaper are available online at portorfordnews.net.
