= Lodi News-Sentinel =

Daily newspaper in Lodi, California

- Type: Daily newspaper
- Format: Broadsheet
- Owner: Central Valley News-Sentinel Inc.
- Founder(s): W. R. Ellis; J. W. McQuaid
- Publisher: Terri Leifeste
- President: Melanie Walsh
- Editor: Scott Howell
- Founded: 1881
- Language: English
- Headquarters: 221 West Oak Street, Suite A Lodi, CA 95240; USA
- OCLC number: 27481158
- Website: www.lodinews.com

The Lodi News-Sentinel is a daily newspaper based in Lodi, California, United States, and serving northern San Joaquin and southern Sacramento counties.

== History ==
The Lodi Sentinel was first published on July 9, 1881, by W. R. Ellis and J. W. McQuaid. In 1901, Samuel B. Axtell bought the paper from the Ellis family. Axtell owned the paper for a decade. He installed electricity in the paper's office in 1904 and began delivery by carrier in 1909. Under Axtell, the paper played a major role in the 1906 election that saw Lodi incorporated as a city.

Axtell had a long standing feud with businessman Charles Sollars, owner of the Lodi Soda Works. The two were neighbors and on June 16, 1911, Axtell fatally shot Sollars with a revolver. The Sentinel was sold to two employees six days after the murder. Axtell was sentenced to life in prison at Folsom State Prison and eventually was paroled. The paper's new owners were Fordyce P. Roper and George H. Moore.

In 1916, the Sentinel purchased the Lodi Post from W. J. Palmer and absorbed the paper. Also in 1916, M, Z. Ramsburg founded the Northern San Joaquin County News in Lodi. A few months later he sold the weekly paper to J. Macheld and Fred J. DeMille. DeMille became the sole owner in 1918 and changed the paper's name to The Lodi News. In March 1918, D. B. Rinfret became a co-owner. The print schedule was expanded to twice weekly, then tri-weekly. In 1925, DeMille sold his interest in the News to Harley M. Leete, who in turn sold out in 1932 to O. L. Powell. It was at that time the News became an afternoon daily. A year later Clyde C. Church bought the paper from Powell and Rinfret.

On June 22, 1935, Roper bought out Moore from the Sentinel after he was appointed state printer. A few days later on June 24, 1935, Church and Roper merged their two papers together to form the Lodi News-Sentinel. Roper died in 1937 and his interests were passed to his widow, which were purchased by Arthur W. Marquardt after she died in 1945. Marquardt and Church sold the News-Sentinel in 1959 to Frederick E. Weybret, former publisher of the Paso Robles Press. On June 1, 2015, the Weybret family sold the News-Sentinel to Central Valley News-Sentinel Inc., led by veteran newspaper publisher Steven Malkowich.

In September 2024, the News-Sentinel announced plans to leave its longtime home on North Church Street. In April 2025, the newspaper officially relocated its offices to 221 West Oak Street, Suite A. As part of this transition, the on-site printing press was retired, and printing operations were moved to the Appeal-Democrat, a sibeling publication in Marysville, California.
