= Cannon Beach Gazette =

Monthly newspaper published Cannon Beach, Oregon

- Type: Monthly newspaper
- Format: Broadsheet
- Owner: Country Media, Inc.
- Founder: Don Holden
- Publisher: Frank Perea
- Editor: Will Chappell
- Founded: 1976
- Ceased publication: 2026
- Headquarters: 1906 Second Street; Tillamook, OR 97141
- Sister newspapers: Tillamook Headlight-Herald
- ISSN: 2834-2666
- OCLC number: 1001993645
- Website: cannonbeachgazette.com

The Cannon Beach Gazette was a monthly newspaper serving Cannon Beach, Oregon. It was published from 1976 to 2026.

== History ==
The Cannon Beach Gazette published its first edition on June 3, 1976, and was founded by on Don Holden. He sold the paper in 1998. Tom Mauldin and Cat Mauldin owned purchased the newspaper in 2003 and sold it to Country Media, Inc. in October 2006. Three years later newspaper was expanded from tabloid size to broadsheet.

Country Media sold it to EO Media Group in February 2013, who sold it back to them in May 2019. Following the sale, the paper's publishing frequency changed from twice monthly to weekly. But in 2024, the newspaper switched to monthly publication. The Gazette ceased in 2026 due to dwindling advertising revenue.

== Awards ==
Under Tom Mauldin and Cat Mauldin's ownership, the Cannon Beach Gazette was honored by the National Newspaper Association six times as America's best small newspaper. The Gazette won three consecutive General Excellence awards (category: non-daily – 3,000 average circulation) from the NNA in 2000, 2001, 2002. The paper's staff also won awards from the Oregon Newspaper Publishers Association in 2018.
