= Samuel Asahel Clarke =

American journalist

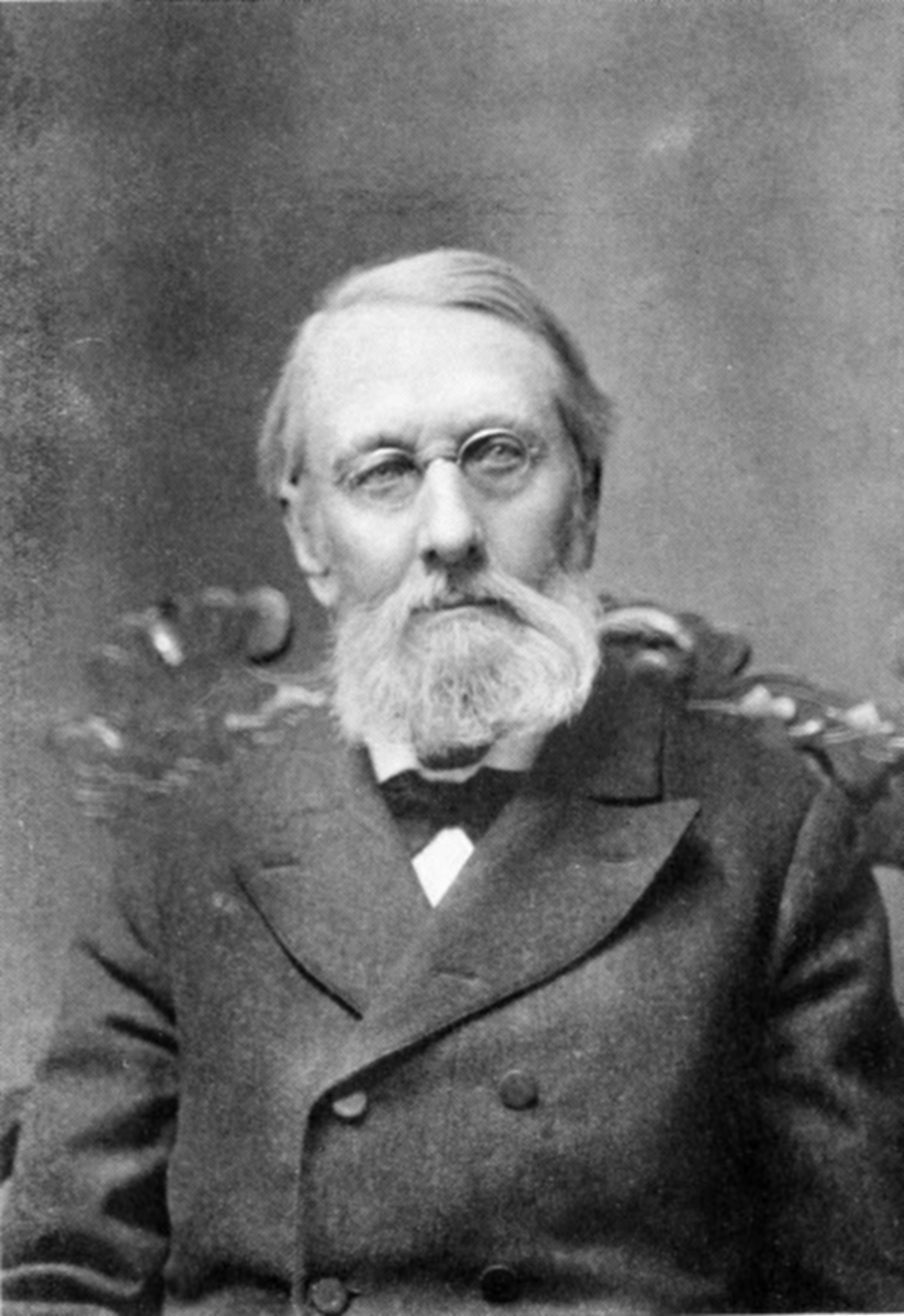
Samuel Asahel Clarke from the frontispiece of his 1905 book Pioneer Days in Oregon.

Samuel Asahel Clarke (March 7, 1827 – August 20, 1909) (more commonly known as S. A. Clarke) was a poet and an early journalist of the U.S. state of Oregon. Born in Cuba and educated in New York City, Clarke went to California to prospect for gold in 1849, and then to Oregon in 1850, where he lived initially in Portland prior to its incorporation. He filed a land claim south of Salem, which became his permanent home; he later built up an orchard there. He married Harriet T. Buckingham.

In 1862 he became the first clerk of the newly-incorporated Baker County in eastern Oregon. He then served as editor of The Oregonian; he resigned that post in May 1865, and was succeeded by Harvey Whitefield Scott. In 1866 he was among those who incorporated the Oregon Central Railroad, prior to Ben Holladay's takeover in 1868. He served as a war correspondent for the New York Times during the Modoc War, though his accuracy has since been questioned, owing to his absence from the war theater. In 1867 purchased the Unionist and changed its name back to the Statesman. In 1872 he purchased the Willamette Farmer, which merged in 1897 with the North Pacific Rural Spirit. In 1874 his poem "Legend of the Cascades" was published in Harper's Magazine.

Clarke later served as librarian in Washington, D.C., at the United States General Land Office, returning to Salem in 1907. He wrote the book Pioneer Days in Oregon (two volumes, J. K. Gill, 1905). He was one of many commentators on the "Whitman Controversy" involving Marcus Whitman's alleged role in the U.S. claim to Oregon; on February 15, 1902, he wrote about the newly-published book The Story of Marcus Whitman for the New York Times Book Review. Bourne, a Yale University professor known as an authority on the matter, subsequently rebutted some of his points, and Clarke replied on March 22, 1902.

He died August 20, 1909, in Salem. He and Harriet had four children; one son, William J. Clarke, also worked in publishing in Oregon.
