= The Columbia County Chronicle & Chief =

Defunct newspaper published in St. Helens, Oregon

The Chronicle & Chief
- Type: Weekly newspaper
- Owner: Country Media, Inc.
- Founder: William Glendye
- Publisher: Frank Perea
- Editor: Joe Warren
- Deputy editor: Will Lohre
- Founded: 1881 (as Oregon Mist)
- Ceased publication: September 25, 2024
- Language: English
- Headquarters: 1805 S. Columbia Blvd.
- City: St. Helens, OR
- Website: thechronicleonline.com thechiefnews.com

The Columbia County Chronicle & Chief was a weekly newspaper published in St. Helens, Oregon, United States. It was formed in December 2023 by the merger of The Chronicle in St. Helens and The Chief in Clatskanie, both published by Country Media, Inc. It was the newspaper of record for Columbia County. It ceased publication in September 2024.

== History ==
=== St. Helens Chronicle ===
The St. Helens Chronicle originated in 1881 as the Oregon Mist. The paper was founded by William Glendye out of a vendetta against Enoch Adams of the Columbian, founded a year earlier. Within two years, Glendye sold the paper to Emmanuel H. Flagg. In 1890, Charles Meserve acquired the paper. Flagg resumed ownership by 1913 and at that time changed the paper’s name to the St. Helens Mist. In 1915, Steele L. Moorhead bought the publication and sold his interests to Simpson C. Morton in 1917. Morton sold the paper in 1926 to Ira B. Hyde Jr. (brother of Arthur M. Hyde) and George D. Borden. In July 1929, Hyde bought the Scappoose Register from Paul Robinson. A month later Barney O. Garrett bought an interest in the Mist. In October 1929, Hyde merged the Register into the Mist. In May 1930, Hyde sold the Mist to John. T. Hoblitt, former owner of the Silverton Appeal, for $25,000. After a month Hoblitt sold the Mist back to Hyde and repurchased the Appeal.

The St. Helens Sentinel was established in 1926 by Lew Cates and J. M. Cummins. It was soon sold to Edward. E. Brodie and then to Fred J. Tooze in 1928. He sold it a year later to Miss Jessica L. Longston. In 1933, Longston and Miss L. Berenice Anderson merged the Mist and Sentinel together to form the St. Helens Sentinel-Mist. In 1963, Longston and A. T. Brownlow sold the paper to John M. McClelland Jr., owner of the Longview Daily News. In 1936, a Paul S. Paulson founded the St. Helens Chronicle. He sold it to Gilbert and Eldridge Crouse in 1965. The Crouse brothers and McClelland bitterly feuded for years until merging their papers together in 1968 to form The Sentinel-Mist Chronicle. In 1985, the paper was sold to Earl Parsons. By then the paper's name was The Chronicle and Sentinel-Mist, finally becoming The Chronicle in 2009. That same year the newspaper was sold to Country Media, Inc.

=== The Clatskanie Chief ===
The Clatskanie Chief was founded in 1891 by F. T. Shute. An article in another newspaper read "The latest newspaper in Oregon, launched upon the fateful sea of journalism May 29th, is the Clatskanie Chief. It is bright and newsy and evidently succeed." In its early days the paper offered a bundled subscription with Better Fruit, a publication in Hood River, Oregon. Shute soon sold the Chief to Enoch C. Blackford. His uncle Enoch W. Conyers, a businessman and a former state legislator, became the controlling owner in 1889. Conyers had been a lifelong Whig, and became a Republican when that party was formed. As his health declined, Conyers sold his interest in the paper. The new owners in 1908 were his niece and nephew Nora H. and George B. Conyers. The siblings sold the paper in 1910 By 1915, the paper was owned by W. G. Baylis. Baylis' business partner Minnie Hyde bought him out in 1920. A couple months later she sold a half-interest to A. E. Veatch, who owned the Rainer Review. Hyde worked as editor and Veatch handled the business-side.

At that time the paper was printed in Rainier until the Chief installed a cylinder press. Veatch sold his interest in 1921 to S. F. Scibird. Hyde's health declined which led her and Scibird to sell the paper in 1922 to Earle Richardson and W. Arther Steele. Richardson went on to buy the Elgin Recorder later that year, and sold his Chief shares to Steele. About three decades later Steele was named president of the Oregon Newspaper Publishers Association in 1953. He published the paper for five decades and also served as the town's mayor for 18 years and a councilman for six years. Arthur and his wife Melvina Steele ran the paper together until Melvina's death in 1972, when their son Gail Steele took over. Arthur Steele died in 1988. Gail Steele died in 1999 and his daughter Deborah Steele Hazen inherited the paper. In 2014, The Clatskanie Chief 's name was changed to simply The Chief. That same year Hazen sold the newspaper to Country Media, Inc.

=== Merger and closure ===
In December 2023, Country Media announced The Chronicle and The Chief will merge to create a new weekly newspaper called The Columbia County Chronicle & Chief. The change was made due to declining revenue and difficulty recruiting and retaining experienced staff. Country Media president Steve Hungerford said: “Combining the two newspapers into one was a last-ditch effort to reduce expenses and reestablish profitability." But the effort was unsuccessful and after eight months the paper was closed. Its last issue was published on September 25, 2024.
