= The Umpqua Post =

Defunct newspaper in Reedsport, Oregon, U.S.

- Type: Weekly newspaper
- Format: Broadsheet
- Owner: Country Media, Inc.
- Publisher: Ben Kenfield
- Editor: Shelby Case
- Founded: 1996
- Ceased publication: 2020
- Language: English
- Headquarters: 2741 Frontage Road, Reedsport, Oregon
- Circulation: 890 weekly
- Website: theumpquapost.com

The Umpqua Post was a weekly newspaper serving Reedsport, Oregon, United States and the surrounding area in Douglas and Coos counties from 1996 to 2020. It was published each Wednesday by The World newspaper in Coos Bay. The paper was distributed in Reedsport and nearby Gardiner, Scottsburg, Elkton, Winchester Bay and Coos Bay.

== History ==
The Umpqua Post was first published on November 4, 1996, by founders Elizabeth Adamo and Nancie Hammond. When it launched, Reedsport had a population around 4,900 and already had another paper called The Courier. This made the town one of two Oregon cities to have two general-circulation weekly newspapers, with the other being John Day.

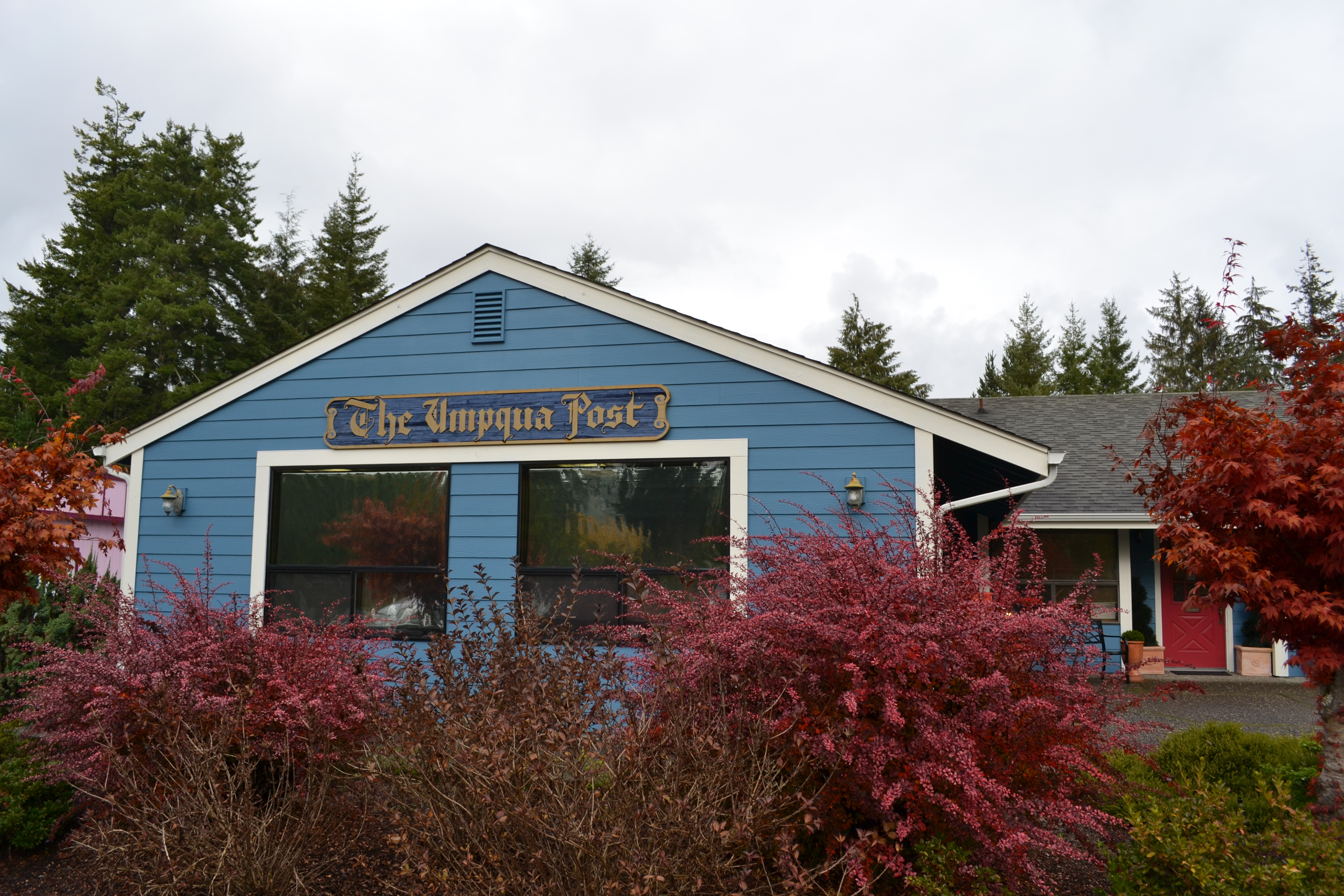
The paper's offices in 2011

Eight years later, in 2004, the Post was purchased by Pulitzer, Inc. Ownership shifted to Lee Enterprises in 2005 with that company's acquisition of Pulitzer. In January 2020, Lee sold the Post to Country Media, Inc., who shuttered the publication in June 2020. At the time, publisher Ben Kenfield cited the economic downturn caused by the COVID-19 pandemic as the reason for the closure.
