= News Media Corporation =

American mass media company (founded 1975)

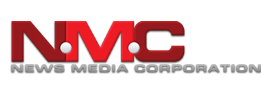
- Type: Private
- Industry: Media
- Founded: 1975
- Founder: John Tompkins
- Defunct: August 6, 2025
- Headquarters: Rochelle, Illinois
- Key people: John Tompkins (Chairman); JJ Tompkins(CEO/President) Billy McMacken (COO)
- Products: Newspapers
- Subsidiaries: News Media Digital
- Website: newsmediacorporation.com

News Media Corporation (NMC) was an American family-owned newspaper corporation that published 25 different newspaper titles in five states across the United States. Until August 2025, it operated in smaller cities and towns with populations between 5,000 and 50,000 in the states of Arizona, Illinois, Nebraska, South Dakota, and Wyoming. On August 7, 2025, the company announced the sudden closure of all of its operations; although several papers were sold days before the announcement, the remaining papers closed, leaving many towns that it had served with no local news source.

== History ==
=== Founding and Acquisitions ===
News Media Corporation was founded in 1975 by John C. Tompkins when at age 21 he purchased The Rochelle News-Leader. The company purchased The Clinton Daily Journal in 1980 and acquired Lindsey Publishing and seven of its Wyoming newspapers in 1987. The sale included the Record-Times, Torrington Telegram, Lingle Guide, Platte County Record-Times, Daily Telegram and Wyoming Government Report newspapers.

NMC went on to buy the Register-Pajaronian in February 1995, King City Rustler, Soledad Bee, Greenfield News and Gonzales Tribune in April 1995, Brookings Register and Huron Plainsman in 1999, Siuslaw News in 2000, Paso Robles Press in 2002, Atascadero News in 2003, Lake Powell Chronicle in 2005, Cottage Grove Sentinel in 2006, Newport News Times in 2007, and Arizona Silver Belt in 2008.

=== Sell-off ===
In July 2019, NMC sold the King City Rustler, Greenfield News, Soledad Bee and Gonzales Tribune to Metro Newspapers, along with the Register-Pajaronian. In August 2019, NMC sold Atascadero News and Paso Robles Press to Nicholas and Hayley Mattson.

In August 2023, NMC sold its cluster of Colorado newspapers to Louie Mullen. The sale included the Valley Courier daily in Alamosa, Monte Vista Journal, The Del Norte Prospector, The Conejos County Citizen, Center Post-Dispatch, The Mineral County Miner, The South Fork Times and SLV Lifestyles. In September 2023, NMC sold its cluster of Oregon newspapers to Country Media, Inc. The sale included the Newport News Times, the Siuslaw News and the Cottage Grove Sentinel.

=== Closure ===
In July 2024, NMC agreed for Carpenter Media Group to manage its papers with the option to acquire the company. NMC leaders J.J. Tompkins and Billy McMacken assumed leadership roles with CMG.

In August 2025, NMC closed its cluster of Wyoming newspapers. It was later reported all of the company’s paper closed after the owners failed to sell the company to CMG. The only paper not to cease was The Clinton Journal because it was sold to former NMC employee Billy McMacken just before NMC ceased. Most NMC papers reopened within the next few weeks after being sold to new owners. Eight papers in Wyoming were sold to publisher Rob Mortimer, of Torrington, along with Jen and Robb Hicks, publishers of the Buffalo Bulletin. About 30 former employees were rehired. Four papers in South Dakota were sold to Champion Media, three papers in Arizona were sold to O’Rourke Media Group and four papers in Illinois were sold to Shaw Media.

== People ==
In August 2018, Nick Monico joined NMC as President and John C. Tompkins was named Chairman. Before joining NMC, Monico was Chief Operations Officer of Wick Communications, vice president of community publishing for GateHouse Media, vice president/COO and chief strategic officer for Trib Total Media in Pittsburgh, president of Gannett Media Network of Central Ohio and COO of Thomson Newspapers’ Chicago and Kansas City divisions.

Nick left News Media Corporation in October 2019 and John Shank was promoted to Chief Operating Officer. Shank, who has worked his entire 31-year multimedia publishing career with NMC, is based in Rochelle and will oversee the company’s entire operation, while continuing on in a dual role as Illinois group publisher.

In January 2022, John C. Tompkins' son JJ Tompkins was promoted to CEO and president to lead the family-owned business into the second generation. The same year Billy McMacken, longtime Brookings Register publisher, became COO to help lead NMC. A week before NMC ceased in August 2025, McMacken left the company to purchase The Normalite Newspaper Group in Illinois and operate it under the name McMacken MultiMedia.

== Atascadero News controversy ==
In 2015, a lawyer for News Media Corporation sent a cease and desist letter to the owner of an online news site also titled Atascadero News, claiming trademark infringement (NMC publishes a paper with the same name). The letter demanded that the owner stop using the name and a similar Twitter handle. The owner of the news site then changed the name to A-Town Daily News, referencing the town’s commonly used nickname.

== Publications owned at time of closure ==
=== Arizona ===
- Gateway to Canyon Country, Page, AZ
- Lake Powell Chronicle, Page, AZ
- Arizona Silver Belt, Globe, AZ
- Copper Country News, Globe, AZ

=== Illinois ===
- The Clinton Journal, Clinton, IL
- Mendota Reporter, Mendota, IL
- Mendota Reporter Money Saver, Mendota, IL
- Ogle County Life, Oregon, IL
- Rochelle News-Leader, Rochelle, IL
- Rochelle Shopping News, Rochelle, IL
- Amboy News, Amboy, IL

=== Nebraska ===
- Business Farmer, Scottsbluff, NE

=== South Dakota ===
- Brookings Register, Brookings, SD
- Huron Plainsman, Huron, SD
- Moody County Enterprise, Flandreau, SD
- PayDay, Huron, SD
- Redfield Press, Redfield, SD

=== Wyoming ===
- Bridger Valley Pioneer, Lyman, WY
- Guernsey Gazette, Guernsey, WY
- Kemmerer Gazette, Kemmerer, WY
- Lingle Guide, Lingle, WY
- Lusk Herald, Lusk, WY
- Pinedale Roundup, Pinedale, WY
- Platte County Merchant, Wheatland, WY
- Record Times, Wheatland, WY
- Sublette Examiner, Pinedale, WY
- The Daily Telegram, Torrington, WY
- Torrington Telegram, Torrington, WY
- Uinta County Herald, Evanston, WY
