= Stayton Mail =

- Type: Weekly newspaper
- Owner(s): Gannett
- Founder(s): E. F. Bennett
- Founded: 1896
- Language: English
- Ceased publication: September 14, 2022
- Headquarters: 400 N. 3rd P. O. Box 400; Stayton OR 97303
- Circulation: 1,742
- OCLC number: 30722127
- Website: statesmanjournal.com/news/stayton

The Stayton Mail was a weekly newspaper published in Stayton in the U.S. state of Oregon. The paper originated in 1896 and ceased in 2022. At the time of closure, it was published by the Statesman Journal; along with the nearby Silverton Appeal Tribune, and was owned by Gannett.

== History ==
E. F. Bennett started the Stayton Mail in 1896 after Horace Mann refused to sell him the Stayton Times. At the time, The Daily Statesman in Salem wrote "Stayton now has two newspapers. E. F. Bennett has just started the Mail there and will cross swords with the Times. There is not sufficient business at Stayton for two papers, so of course it will be a case of the survival of the fittest." In 1901, Bennett sold it to H. E. Browne, who later founded the Silverton Tribune. Later that year Browne sold the paper to E. D. Alexander. Fred G. Conley became editor in 1908. At that time he made a substantial investment in a Mergenthaler typesetting machine and changed the publication schedule from weekly to semi-weekly starting in January 1909.

In 1910, C. D. Babcock resigned from his position as Salem correspondent to The Oregonian to purchase the Stayton Mail. A year later Babcock was appointed clerk of corporations by Oregon Secretary of State Ben W. Olcott and he sold the paper to Russell W. Shields. In 1913, W. C. Parry retired and E. M. Olmstead took over the Mail printing plant. In 1914, former Mail owner Alexander started a rival paper called the Stayton Standard. In 1917, Standard owner C. E. Daugherty bought the Mail and absorbed it into his paper, but kept the Mail name. In 1918, Charles S. Clark bought the Mail from Daugherty and Alexander. In 1921, Clark sold the paper to Mrs. Frances Parry. A year later Alexander bought the paper again. A month prior he had worked as a postmaster. After the sale he installed a new linotype machine. Alexander leased the paper in 1930 to A. F. Fletcher and then took it over again after a year. In 1934, Ralph Curtis purchased the paper and sold it two years later to Hal Cuffel. Lawrence E. Spraker, former owner of the Condon Globe-Times and Star theater proprietor, bought the Mail in 1939 from Cuffel.

In 1964, Spraker sold the Mail to the Santiam Publishing Company, an enterprise owned by Robert W. Chandler, John E. Buchner and Frank T. Crow Jr. Over time Crow became the sole owner and in 1982 he sold the paper to Bill Woodall. Two years later Woodall purchased the Silverton Appeal Tribune from Joe and Joan Davis. In 1989, Woodall sold his business North Santiam Newspapers, Inc. back to Frank Crow. The sale included the Mail, Appeal-Tribune and North Santiam Advertiser. A year later the company filed for Chapter 11 bankruptcy protection and then was sold in December 1990 to the Statesman Journal Co. for $1.1 million. The new owners published the Statesman Journal and were owned by Gannett. Three decades later Gannett discontinued the Mail as of Sept. 14, 2022.
