= Country Media, Inc. =

American media and web design company

- Founded: 2000; 26 years ago
- Headquarters location: 388 State St #800; Salem, Oregon, U.S.
- Key people: Joe Warren (CEO)
- Owners: Steve and Carol Hungerford
- Official website: countrymedia.net

Country Media, Inc. is an American media and web design company based in Salem, Oregon, which owns 7 community newspaper properties in Oregon. The company previously owned newspapers in the West North Central states and California.

== History ==
=== Origins ===
Country Media, Inc. was largely founded by Steve Hungerford, a Nebraska-native who earned his bachelor's degree in journalism from the University of Nebraska and a master's in journalism from the University of Oregon. He moved to Oregon in 1973 to purchase the weekly Milwaukie Review newspaper. In the mid-1980s, he was named director of human resources at the Salem Statesman Journal and, in 1988, became executive editor and publisher of the Daily Enterprise Courier in Oregon City. Hungerford and his wife Carol moved to Nebraska in 1990 when he was named publisher of the Scottsbluff Star-Herald. A decade later Hungerford left his job in March 2000 to found Country Media, Inc. with his wife and a group of investors from across the United States. Soon after, the newly formed company based in Scottsbluff, Nebraska purchased 18 weekly newspapers.

=== Midwest business operations ===
In September 2000, Country Media purchased several papers from the Virginia-based Dickson Media, Inc. Included in the sale were South Dakota newspapers based in Sturgis, Deadwood, Newell, Lemmon and Belle Fourche; and North Dakota newspapers based in Hettinger, Langdon, Killdeer, New England along with Baker, Montana. A national agribusiness weekly based in Sturgis called Tri-State Livestock News was also included in the sale.

In October 2000, Country Media purchased the Chadron Record in Chadron and the Hot Springs Star in Hot Springs from CNHI, which had owned the two papers since March 1998.

Country Media marked its first year in business by purchasing the Farmer & Rancher Exchange, a weekly agribusiness advertising publication in Pierre with a 43,000 circulation. It had previously been owned by Roger and Helen Merriman for 25 years. This purchase in September 2001 was the 18th paper County Media acquired.

In December 2004, Country Media sold eight weekly newspapers, two shoppers and a monthly gaming publication to Lee Enterprises. The sale included South Dakota papers Meade County Times-Tribune, Black Hills Press, Butte County Valley Irrigator, Belle Fourche Post, Belle Fourche Bee, Lawrence County Centennial and Hot Springs Star. Lee also bought the Chadron Record in Nebraska, Star Extra shopper in South Dakota, Your Neighbor shopper in Nebraska, and monthly Deadwood Gaming in South Dakota. Country Media retained ownership of eight newspapers and two agriculture publications.

In February 2014, Country Media shuttered the Lemmon Leader. The paper founded in 1906 was closed due to "a financial challenge," in part attributed to competition from rival newspaper The Dakota Herald.

In November 2019, Country Media announced plans to close three North Dakota newspapers: the Adams Country Record in Hettinger, The Herald in New England, and the Dunn County Herald. According to Steve Andrist, executive director of the North Dakota Newspaper Association, Country Media told him the company's newspapers were profitable, but that profit didn't justify the time and effort it took to properly manage them. After failing to find a buyer, the company decided to close the three papers. After news of the closures broke, by December, the Adams County Record and The Herald avoided closure after selling to Grant County News owner Jill Friesz. The Dunn County Herald closed for good in 2019.

In May 2021, Country Media sold the Bowman County Pioneer in Bowman and Fallon County Times in Baker to a joint venture between Little Missouri Media owner Dudley Stuber and The Badlands Patriot, a company owned by Stuber's daughter and son-in-law, Mikki and Brandon Pryor. That same year in November, Country Media shuttered the Cavalier County Republican in Langdon. The paper had been published since 1889. After its closure, County Media had no business operations in the midwest.

=== Oregon/California business operations ===
Country Media purchased its first Oregon newspaper, the Cannon Beach Gazette, in October 2006. In April 2007, the company acquired The Headlight Herald in Tillamook and The News Guard in Lincoln City. Those two papers had previously been owned by Oregon Coast Newspapers LLC since February 2003. In October 2007, Country Media purchased the Seaside Signal. A few years later Country Media in February 2009 acquired the St. Helens Chronicle and Sentinel Mist.

In January 2011, Country Media acquired the monthly Coast River Business Journal. The business publication had been founded in Astoria five years prior. The same year in June, the company acquired the biweekly North Coast Citizen newspaper in Manzanita. The paper had previously been owned by the East Oregonian Publishing Company (now EO Media Group), who had purchased it in 2007 from Jan and Dave Fisher.

In February 2013, Country Media sold the Seaside Signal, Cannon Beach Gazette and Coast River Business Journal to EO Media Group.

In July 2014, Country Media acquired the weekly newspaper The Chief in Clatskanie. The paper had previously been owned by two families under the name Clatskanie Chief Publishing Co. for 92 years.

In May 2019, Country Media re-acquired the Cannon Beach Gazette from EO Media Group. The company had previously owned the Gazette from 2006 to 2013. Following the sale, the paper's publishing frequency changed from twice monthly to weekly.

In July 2019, Country Media acquired the Del Norte Triplicate and Curry Coastal Pilot from the bankrupt Western Communications, Inc. Following the sale, three employees at the Triplicate were laid off. The sale price for both papers was $350,000.

In January 2020, Country Media acquired daily newspaper The World in Coos Bay, as well as the weekly newspapers Western World in Bandon and The Umpqua Post in Reedsport from Southwest Oregon Publishing Co., a wholly owned subsidiary of Lee Enterprises. Due to the COVID-19 recession in the United States, The Umpqua Post ceased operations in June and The World reduced its print days from five to two. The Bandon Western World printed its final issue in July 2020.

In September 2023, Country Media acquired three weekly newspapers, the Newport News-Times, Cottage Grove Sentinel and Siuslaw News, from News Media Corporation. News Media Cooperation had purchased the Siuslaw News in 2000, and the other two papers in 2006. In October that same year, Country Media acquired the Polk County Itemizer-Observer from Scott J. Olson. In December 2023, County Media announced The Chronicle in St. Helens and The Chief in Clatskanie will merge into a single weekly newspaper called The Columbia County Chronicle & Chief.

In January 2024, Country Media merged Lincoln City News Guard and the Newport News-Times into a single newspaper named after the Lincoln County Leader, which had published for 94 years from 1893 to 1987. The plan was first announced in the previous October. Also in January, the Cannon Beach Gazette switched to monthly publication. In September 2024, the company closed The Columbia County Chronicle & Chief due to declining revenue and difficulty hiring staff. The Del Norte Triplicate was also closed a year later for similar reasons. After closing, Dan Schmidt bought the Triplicate and relaunched it.

In February 2026, Country Media discontinued the North Coast Citizen and the Cannon Beach Gazette. That October, the company announced it will shutter the Cottage Grove Sentinel.

== Newspapers ==
Newspapers owned by Country Media, Inc.
State	Service Area	Newspaper
Oregon	Coos Bay	The World
Oregon	Tillamook	Tillamook Headlight-Herald
Oregon	Brookings	Curry Coastal Pilot
Oregon	Newport	Lincoln County Leader
Oregon	Cottage Grove	Cottage Grove Sentinel
Oregon	Florence	Siuslaw News
Oregon	Dallas	Polk County Itemizer-Observer
