= Arizona Silver Belt =

Newspaper in Globe, Arizona and Miami, Arizona

- Type: Weekly newspaper
- Owner: O’Rourke Media Group
- Founder(s): Aaron H. Hackney; A.H. Morehead
- Publisher: Jim O'Rourke
- Founded: May 1878
- Language: English
- Headquarters: 422 W Sullivan St. Miami, AZ 85539
- Circulation: 987 (as of 2022)
- OCLC number: 16995276
- Website: silverbelt.com

A Hot Fire in the Arizona Silver Belt of Globe, Arizona on January 11, 1896

The Arizona Silver Belt is a newspaper in Miami, Arizona. It was one of the first newspapers published in the state.

== History ==
On May 2, 1878, the Arizona Silver Belt was first published in Globe, Arizona. It was founded by Judge Aaron Harrison Hackney, and A.H. Morehead. The two had purchased the press of the Las Cruses Echo and relocated it to Globe to start their weekly newspaper. At that time Globe was a small isolated mining camp and the paper's name referenced the shape of the area's ore deposit. Equipment was brought in by burro from Silver City, New Mexico.

Hackney convinced the telegraph company to extend its wire to his office so he could communicate with various military posts in Arizona. This allowed his paper to cover skirmishes during the Apache Wars. The two men were soon joined by Joseph H. Hamill, Hackney's teenage nephew, who worked as a reporter. In May 1879, Morehead exited the business. In 1884, Hamill was named co-editor, working alongside his uncle.

Hackney wrote editorials arguing for the construction of a railroad from Bowie to Globe, which was completed a year before his death. On December 2, 1899, Hackney died. Hamill was left was the sole owner. In 1906, editor Hamill became a member of the Associated Press wire service and expanded the paper into a daily, with the name changed to the Daily Arizona Silver Belt. In 1907, Hamill leased the paper to Alfred A. Cohn, Harry C. Holdsworth, and Harry H. Hiener. Hamill then moved to San Diego.

Cohn was bought out after a year. The other two eventually acquired full ownership from Hamill. In 1910, James T. Williams, owner of the Tucson Citizen, acquired the paper. In May 1911, Sidney Bieber bought the paper from Williams. A month later Cleve W. Van Dyke bought the paper. Van Dyke owned a mining company helped found a rival town called Miami. Globe was hit by a local depression was the mines closed down. In early January 1913, Van Dyke announced plans to relocate his printing plant from Globe to Miami. Later that month Hamill started a new morning daily paper in Globe called the Arizona Record. The Record launched in February, and the Silver Belt published its first edition in Miami on May 31. That September, the Silver Belt switched from a morning to an afternoon paper.

In 1917, Silver Belt editor Pat R. Sullivan died. In 1926, Hamill resigned from the Record and was succeeded by advertising manager Ralph E. Herron, who edited the paper for 32 years before retiring. In 1927, Hamill died. In 1929, a fire caused $20,000 worth of damage to the Silver Belt's printing plant, but its archive survived. In 1931, the Silver Belt reverted to a weekly amid the Great Depression. In August 1935, it ceased under editor Raymond Carlson, but was revived 18 months later under editor E.R. Kielglass. Van Dyke remained the owner throughout this time. In 1945, Van Dyke died. The Silver Belt was then inherited by his daughter Edith Fritz and her husband Albert Watson Fritz.

In 1958, the Frtizs acquired the Superior Sun. In 1959, the couple acquired the South Phoenix Roundup. Later that year, they sold the Sun and Apache Junction Sentinel to James R. Brooks, owner of the Gilbert Enterprise. Fritz retained ownership of the Silver Belt and the Roundup. In 1959, Silver Belt founder Hackney was inducted into the Arizona Newspapers Association Hall of Fame. In 1960, the Fritzs leased the Silver Belt to the owners of the Record, and John D. Seater Jr. became publisher of both papers. The Fritzs then moved their printing equipment from Miami to Phoenix to continue publishing the Roundup, which was sold a year later to a group of employees.

In 1967, Thomas E. Anderson succeeded Seater Jr. as publisher. In 1975, the Silver Belt and Record merged. The older name was retained, thus the Record ceased and the Silver Belt returned to Globe. Anderson eventually retired and died in 1989. In 1997, Hollinger International sold several papers including the Silver Belt to Liberty Group Publishing, which later became GateHouse Media. In 2008, GateHouse Media sold the paper to News Media Corporation. The paper ceased in 2025, but was then sold to and revived by O’Rourke Media Group. The Silver Belt then relocated again to Miami, Arizona.
