= Atascadero News =

Newspaper in Atascadero, California

The Atascadero News
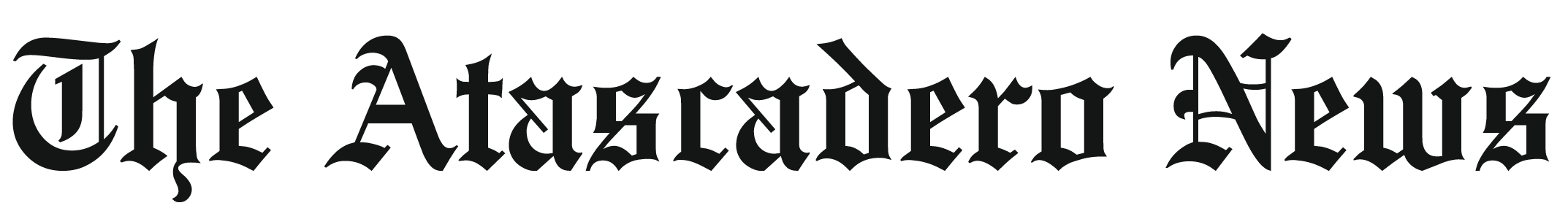

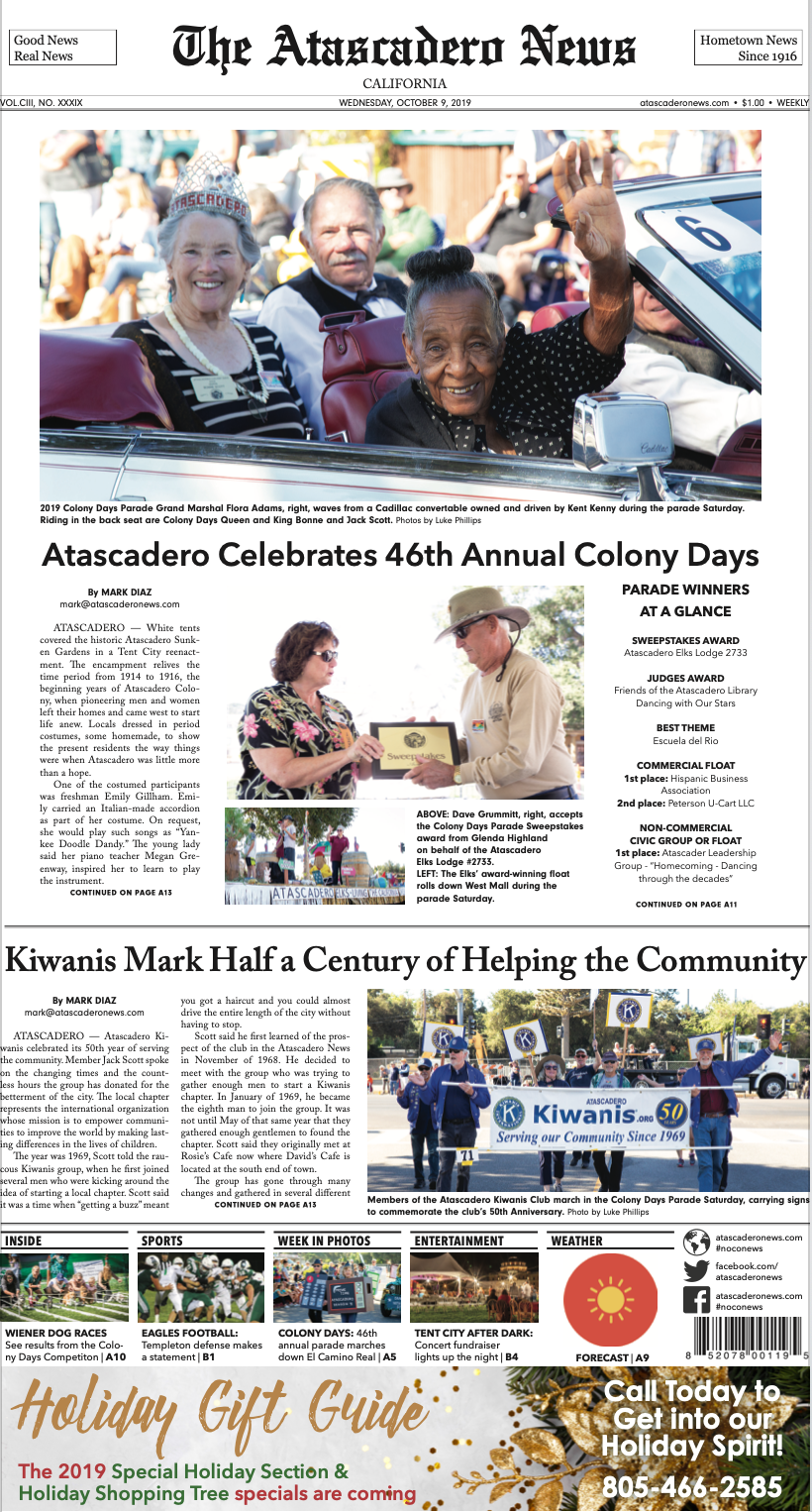
- Type: Weekly newspaper
- Format: Broadsheet
- Owner: 13 Stars Media
- Founder: Edward Gardner Lewis
- Publisher: Hayley Mattson
- Editor: Melissa Mattson
- Founded: 1916
- Language: English
- Headquarters: 5860 El Camino Real; Atascadero, California 93422
- Circulation: 2,784
- Sister newspapers: Paso Robles Press
- Website: atascaderonews.com

The Atascadero News is a weekly printed newspaper and daily online publication based in Atascadero, San Luis Obispo County, California. It serves the residents of northern San Luis Obispo County. The newspaper is operated by its 13 Stars Media, with a readership primarily in Atascadero and surrounding communities, including Templeton, Creston and Santa Margarita.

== History ==
On January 22, 1916, the first edition of The Atascadero News was published. L.D. Beckwith was managing editor. The paper was under the editorial control of Edward Gardner Lewis, who founded Atascadero as a planned, utopian community three years earlier. In 1920, Lewis replaced Beckwith as editor, and soon gave the position to Capt. Harry L. Wells. In 1923, Rev. H.J. Loken became editor. In May 1925, Lewis lost control over the News after his company, the Colony Holding Corporation, was forced into involuntary bankruptcy.

In July 1925, Ted R. Bishop leased the paper and became its publisher. He published the newspaper through the Great Depression. The paper dropped from eight pages to six and finally to four in the 1930s. In 1935, L.B. Garrett of Los Angeles acquired the paper. In July 1936, J. Montgomery Brown bought the paper from Garrett. In 1940, his wife died.

In September 1947, Vernon S. Tegland, former owner of the Fallbrook Enterprise, bought the paper from Brown. After a year, he sold it in July 1949 to George J. Porter and Parke F. Keays, who both worked at the Custer County Chief in Nebraska. Lon W. Allan joined the paper sometime in the '60s and would go on to serve as its editor for decades before retirement. In January 1972, Keays retired and sold his interest in the business to Porter and his three sons, Jim, Jud and Jack. In 1978, Porter retired.

In 2003, News Media Corporation acquired the News from the Porter family. At that time the paper printed twice-weekly with a circulation of 7,000 and a staff of 24. A year earlier, the company had acquired the Paso Robles Press. In 2019, the company sold the two papers to Nicholas and Hayley Mattson. In 2024, Allan fully retired and penned his final “About the Colony" column. Allan died two years later.
