= The Clinton Journal =

News

- Type: Biweekly newspaper
- Owner(s): Billy McMacken
- Publisher: Katy O'Grady-Pyne
- Editor: Gordon Woods
- Headquarters: 111 S. Monroe St. Clinton IL 61727
- Website: theclintonjournal.com

The Clinton Journal is a twice-weekly newspaper published in Clinton, Illinois. Competitors include The Pantagraph, the Farmer City Journal and the Herald & Review.

== History ==
Originally known as the Daily Public, the Journal has been the major newspaper in Clinton since the mid-19th century. Its offices are now located at 111 S. Monroe Street, right off the downtown square.

In January 1979,Margaret Peltz sold the paper to McNaughton Newspapers, who in turn sold it in August 1980 to News Media Corporation. The company ceased in August 2025 and all of its papers shuttered except for The Clinton Journal because it was sold to undisclosed buyers. It was later reported the new owner was Billy McMacken, a former NMC employee who had also purchased the Normalite Newspaper Group from owner Ed Pyne.
