= Silverton Appeal Tribune =

Newspaper in the U.S. State of Oregon

- Type: Weekly newspaper
- Owner(s): Gannett
- Founder(s): Henry G. Guild
- Editor: Don Currie
- Founded: 1880
- Language: English
- Ceased publication: September 14, 2022
- Headquarters: Silverton, Oregon United States
- Circulation: 2,334
- OCLC number: 42844502
- Website: statesmanjournal.com/news/silverton

The Silverton Appeal Tribune was a weekly newspaper published in Silverton in the U.S. state of Oregon. The paper originated in 1880 and ceased in 2022. At the time of closure, it was published by the Statesman Journal; along with the nearby Stayton Mail, and was owned by Gannett.

== History ==
The first newspaper in Silverton, the Appeal was founded as a weekly newspaper in 1880 by Henry G. Guild. Author Homer Davenport, who was raised in Silverton, had strong ties to the Appeal in his youth; he discussed its early days in his autobiographical work The Country Boy (1910), and described Guild as the "best editor the Silverton Appeal ever had."

The paper changed hands a number of times in its first few decades. In 1890, Guild sold the Appeal to Lou Adams and Fred Warnock. Edgar W. Stahl was connected to the Appeal until he severed his ties to start a rival paper called the Silvertonian in 1902. He sold it a few months later to Wiles & Hodges. In 1903, H. E. Browne & Dr. Leonard, who owned the Silvertonian, purchased the Appeal from J. E. Hosmer and consolidated the two papers to form the Silvertonian-Appeal. H. E. Browne ran the Appeal from 1904 to 1910, part of the time in partnership with his brother Gilford D. Browne. In April 1910, H. E. Hodges became the owner.

In 1913, the Tribune was founded in nearby Mount Angel by H. E. Browne. He moved it to Silverton two years later and sold it in 1920 to Edward B. Kottek. In 1915, John Thomas Hoblitt purchased the Silverton Appeal. In December 1929, he sold the paper to H. T. Allen. Hoblitt then purchased the St. Helens Mist in May 1930 for $25,000 from Ira B. Hyde. After a month Hoblitt sold the Mist back to Hyde and repurchased the Appeal from Allen. In July 1930, Hoblitt purchased the Silverton Tribune from Kottek and merged it with his Appeal to form the Silverton Appeal-Tribune.

In 1960 Hoblitt's son, Mahlon Hoblitt, and his daughter-in-law Hildegarde Hoblitt sold the paper to Ralph and Geneva Rose. Around that time Joe and Joan Davis became business partners with the Roses and bought the paper in 1970 when they retired. In 1976, Rodger Eddy, who owned the North Willamette News and Molalla Pioneer, sold the Mount Angel News to Joe Davis, who merged it with his Appeal-Tribune to form the Silverton Appeal-Tribune and Mount Angel News. In 1984, Davis sold the Appeal-Tribune/Mount Angel News to Bill Woodall, owner of the Stayton Mail. In 1989, Woodall sold his business North Santiam Newspapers, Inc. to Frank Crow. The sale included the Mail, Appeal-Tribune and North Santiam Advertiser. A year later the company filed for Chapter 11 bankruptcy protection and then was sold in December 1990 to the Statesman Journal Co. for $1.1 million. The new owners published the Statesman Journal and were owned by Gannett. Three decades later Gannett discontinued the Appeal Tribune as of Sept. 14, 2022.

== Ames building ==
At one time the printing press for the Appeal was located in Silverton's historic Ames Building, which was redeveloped in 2016.

== Awards ==
Over the years the paper won multiple awards from the Oregon Newspaper Publishers Association's Better Newspaper Contest.
