= Curry County Reporter =

Weekly newspaper published in Gold Beach, Oregon

- Type: Weekly newspaper
- Owner(s): Matt and Kim Hall
- Founder: E. M. Bogardus
- Founded: 1916
- Language: English
- Headquarters: PO Box 5, Port Orford, OR 97465
- Circulation: 2,180
- Sister newspapers: Myrtle Point Herald; Port Orford News
- OCLC number: 34877605
- Website: currycountyreporter.com

The Curry County Reporter is a weekly newspaper in Gold Beach, Oregon. It was established in 1916, and has a circulation of 2,180.

== History ==
In March 1916, the Gold Beach Reporter was first published. It was founded by Judge Jeremiah Jerry Huntley, Collier H. Buffington and E. M. Bogardus. Bogardus was the editor and business manager. That July, the Reporter bought and absorbed a rival paper called the Gold Beach Globe.

In September 1917, Bogardus bought the Reporter. a month later he sold the paper to A. E. Guyton and John A. Juza. In April 1922, Juza assumed complete ownership of the paper after buying nearly all company stock. That November, Juza purchased the Del Norte Triplicate. A month later he moved to Crescent City, California, to manage the new paper and Roy M. Avery was put in charge of the Reporter. It appears around this time the Gold Beach paper was acquired by Roderick L. Macleary, son of merchant Donald Macleay and president of the Macleary Estate Co., in Wedderburn.

In August 1923, W. E. Hassler was hired as editor and publisher. That December, the paper was renamed to the Curry County Reporter. In February 1925, the business bought the Port Orford Tribune. That August, the Tribune was merged it into the Reporter, leaving it as the only paper in Curry County. In November 1926, Hassler was succeeded as editor by A.E. Adams after he was hired as advertising manager at the Coos Bay Times. A year later Hassler founded the Powers Courier. In October 1927, Adams resigned and was replaced by Robert L. Withrow. In June 1932, plant foreman K.E. McMullen succeeded Withrow as editor.

In October 1932, Reuben C. Young bought the Reporter from the Macleay Estate Co. In 1941, he sold it to S.L. Burton. Burton previously owned the Milwaukie Review and published the Reporter until his death in 1952. His widow Jennie Burton and son Wesley Burton then published the paper. In 1952, they sold the paper to Mrs. Wickes Shaw and George Megrath. Megrath soon moved to Petersburg, Alaska, to edit The Press.

In 1956, Shaw sold the paper to Robert and Betty Van Leer. In 1970, Mr. Van Leer was elected president of the Oregon Newspaper Publishers Association and was awarded the Amos E. Voorhies Award from the ONPA in 1992. The couple published the paper for 41 years until passing it on to their daughter Molly Walker and her husband Jim Walker in 1997. Robert Van Leer was inducted into the Oregon Newspaper Hall of Fame in 2008. Joel Summer and Rebecca Macko bought the paper from the Walkers and published it for seven years. In 2012, they sold the Reporter to Matt and Kim Hall, owners of the Port Orford News.
