= Seaside Signal =

Weekly newspaper published in Seaside, Oregon

- Type: Weekly newspaper
- Format: Broadsheet
- Owner: EO Media Group
- Founder: Robert M. Watson
- Publisher: Kari Borgen
- Editor: Jim Van Nostrand
- Founded: March 1905
- Language: English
- Headquarters: 1555 N Roosevelt Dr, Seaside, Clatsop County, Oregon
- Circulation: 703 Print; 305 Digital (as of 2023)
- OCLC number: 30724988
- Website: seasidesignal.com

The Seaside Signal is a weekly newspaper published for the community of Seaside, Oregon, United States.

== History ==
The Seaside Signal was founded Saturday, March 25, 1905 as a weekly. It was edited by Robert M. Watson. The paper was a tabloid format and cost $2.00 for a year's subscription. On May 11, 1907 the newspaper changed to a broadsheet format. Since then, the Signal has changed formats numerous times. In 1910, Watson retired and leased the paper to Erle Norton Hurd and Walter B. Scott.

In December 1927, Hurd sold the Signal to Max Schafer Sr. along with Raymond Herald owners C.S. Beall and Harry Beall. Schafer Sr. operated the paper with his son Max Schafer Jr. for decades until selling it in 1974. The new owners were H.H. Publishing Co., a corporation operated by three publishers: Dave Juenke, Walter Taylor and Lee Irwin.

In 1980, Juenke sold the Signal to Scripps-Ifft Newspapers Inc. The company sold the newspaper to Swift-Pioneer Publishing Co. in 1983, which later became Swift Communications. A subsidiary called Pacific Coast Newspapers operated the Signal, along with the Tillamook Headlight-Herald and The News Guard in Lincoln City.

In February 2003, the Signal was sold to Kyle Larson, who sold it again in June 2005 to Tom and Annie Mullen and Gary and Sue Stevenson of Sheridan, Wyoming, and Robb and Jenn Hicks of Buffalo, Wyoming. The newspaper changed ownership for fourth time in seven years when in October 2007 it was sold to Country Media, Inc. In 2013, the paper was acquired by EO Media Group. In October 2024, EO was sold to Carpenter Media Group.
