= Custer County Chief =

- Type: Weekly newspaper
- Format: Broadsheet
- Owner(s): Horizon Publications
- Publisher: Purcell Bros.
- Editor: Mona Weatherly
- General manager: Donnis Hueftle-Bullock
- Founded: 1892
- Language: English
- Headquarters: 305 South 10th Ave, Broken Bow, Custer County, NE 68822
- Circulation: 1,703
- OCLC number: 13412891
- Website: custercountychief.com

The Custer County Chief is an American weekly newspaper serving the town of Broken Bow, Nebraska and surrounding Custer County. It is owned by Horizon Publications. As of 2024, the paper had a print circulation of 1,300 and a staff of two full-timers and two part-timers.

== History ==
Founded on April 22, 1892, the paper was the second paper founded by Emerson R. Purcell. Purcell, an Illinoisan who had moved to Crete with his family in 1884, had initially started a paper with his brother in Merna, on borrowed capital of 120 dollars. That paper was a success, and after selling it to a group of local politicians he moved on with his brother to found a new paper in the town of Broken Bow. It aligned itself with the Populist cause that was popular in the state at the time, and benefited from political patronage while that cause was well supported. As Populist fervor wound down it took a neutral position.

On the death of Purcell in 1943, son-in-law Parke Keays took over briefly before passing it on to Emerson's son Harry Purcell, who ran it until 1984. The paper was sold in turn to Smith Brothers Corporation and CNHI before ending up with Chicago's Horizon Publications, the current owner.

Over the first seventy-five years of its history, the paper absorbed over a dozen smaller papers, including the Custer County Republican (1921), Merna Messenger (1944), Sandhill News (1956), and Seven Valleys Farmer (1967).

In the mid-20th century, the paper was notable for its extensive network of correspondents. At the time of Emerson Purcell's death, they numbered over 110, each sending updates to the newspaper on the 15 towns it covered. In the mid-1950s it maintained its position as largest weekly in the state, a position it had held at least intermittently since the 1910s.

In 2004, the paper was the subject of some attention when the Associated Press reported on its "backward" printed edition, issued in honor of International Left-Handers Day.

In March 2018 the paper discontinued printing in Broken Bow, moving its printing operation to nearby Kearney, Nebraska. Its offices remain in Broken Bow, at the "fireproof" building built by Emerson Purcell in 1929.
