= Lebanon Express =

Newspaper published in Lebanon, Oregon

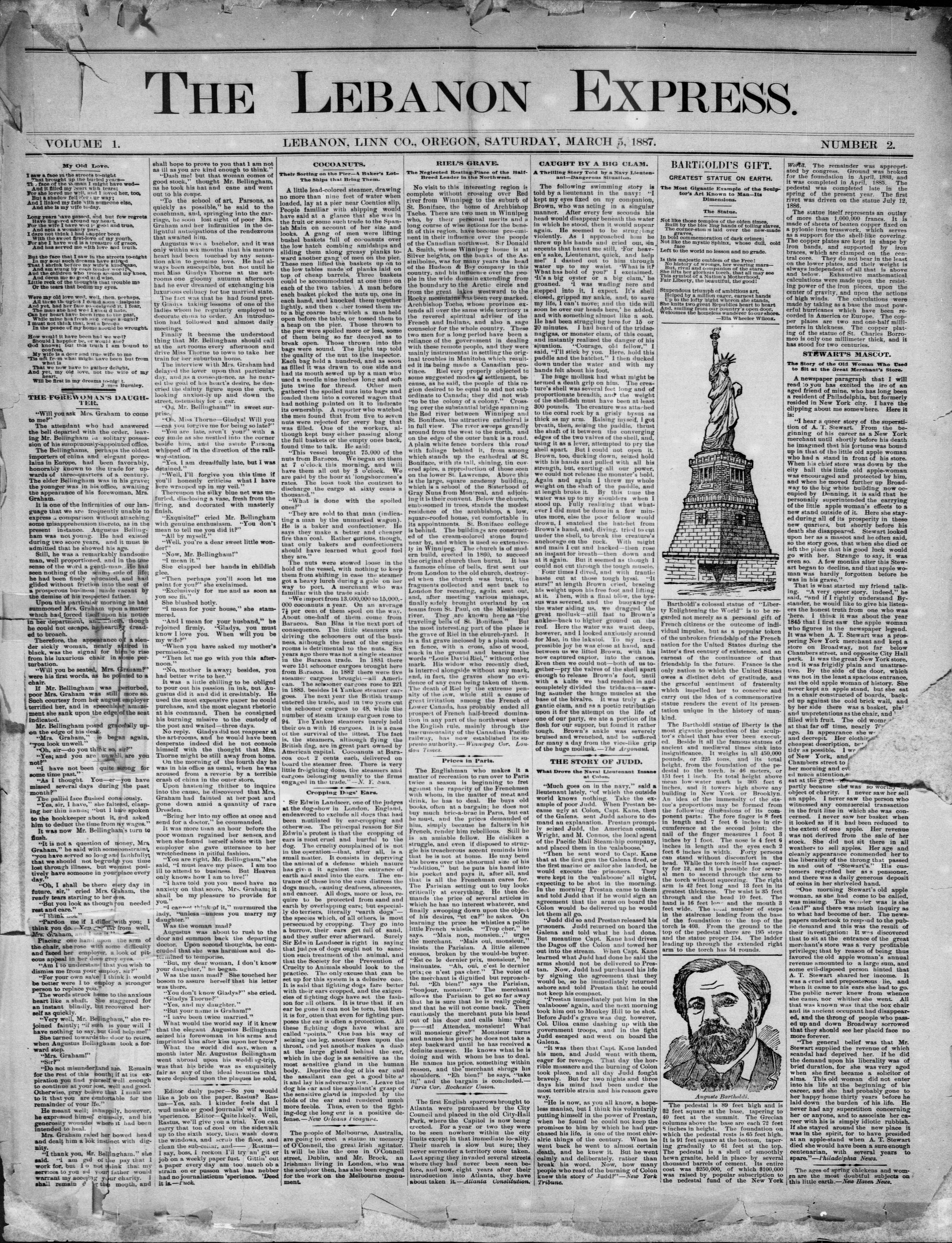
- Front page on March 5, 1887
- Type: Weekly newspaper
- Format: Broadsheet
- Owner: Lee Enterprises
- Founder: J.H. Stine
- Founded: February 26, 1887; 139 years ago
- Ceased publication: January 18, 2023
- Language: English
- Headquarters: 90 East Grant Street; Lebanon, Oregon 97355
- Country: United States
- Circulation: 2,149 (as of 2014)
- ISSN: 2472-6648
- OCLC number: 38041261
- Website: lebanon-express.com

The Lebanon Express was a weekly newspaper published in Lebanon, Oregon, from 1887 to 2023.

== History ==
On Sept. 10, 1886 J.H. Stine published the first edition of the Brownsville Informant in Brownsville, Oregon. After a year, he discontinued the Informant, and relocated his printing plant to Lebanon, Oregon, to launch a new paper.

On Feb. 26, 1887, J. H. Stine published the first edition of the Lebanon Express. Stine sold the paper after a year to Hugh Yandel Kirkpatrick and T.B. Bugler, who sold out after two months.

In 1891, George L. Alexander and Mr. Adams launched The Weekly Advance in Eugene, Oregon. It was affiliated with the Farmers' Alliance. After a month, the two relocated the Advance to Lebanon. In 1892, Adams left the firm.

On April 15, 1897, Kirkpatrick and Alexander merged the Express and the Advance to form the Lebanon Express-Advance. In 1912, the name was changed back to the Lebanon Express.

In 1913, Kirkpatrick sold out to Alexander after becoming the town's postmaster. H.E Brown, formerly of the Independence Express, the bought a half-interest, but exited the firm after a year. In 1920, T.R. MacMillan became a co-owner.

In 1936, Alexander and MacMillan sold the paper to Harry W. Fredericks and Robert M. Hayden. In 1940, Hayden became the sole owner, and operated the Express for 34 years until selling it in 1970 to the Democrat-Herald Publishing Co.

Capital Cities purchased the company in 1980, which itself was acquired by The Walt Disney Company in 1995. Disney sold its Oregon newspapers to Lee Enterprises in 1997. The Express published its final edition on Jan. 18, 2023 and rolled coverage of the area into the Albany Democrat-Herald.
