= Civil War newspaper suppression in Oregon =

A number of pro-Southern, Democratic newspapers in Oregon were suppressed by the federal government of the United States in the early 1860s.

Among them were the following weekly newspapers: the Albany Oregon Democrat, edited by Delazon Smith, the Corvallis Union, the Jacksonville Southern Oregon Gazette. The Portland Advertiser, the only daily newspaper in the state at the time, was also suppressed. Mail suppression was the primary means of suppressing the papers.
