= Siuslaw News =

Weekly newspaper published in Florence, Oregon

- Type: Weekly newspaper
- Owner: Country Media, Inc.
- Publisher: Joe Warren
- Editor: Tony Reed
- Founded: 1904
- Language: English
- Headquarters: 388 State St #800; Salem, OR 97301
- Circulation: 4,000
- OCLC number: 23860221
- Website: thesiuslawnews.com

The Siuslaw News is a weekly newspaper published in Florence, Oregon, United States, since 1904. The News covers western Lane County, from the Pacific Ocean to Deadwood and Greenleaf, and from Yachats on the north to Gardiner on the south. It is published on Wednesdays and has a circulation of 4,000. The paper was published weekly until 2000, when its frequency was increased to twice-weekly, and returned to weekly publication in July 2022.

== History ==
Around 1890, Col. B. F. Alley founded a printing plant in Florence and started a newspaper called The West. The paper ceased after six years. M. D. Morgan later bought the facility and published the first issue of the Siuslaw Oar on June 8, 1928.

In 1958, B. H. "Bud" Rose started two papers, the Southern Douglas Register-Advertiser in Myrtle Creek and the Western Lane News-Advertiser in Florence. Later that year Dave Holman purchased the plant and continued the Florence-edition of the paper.

In 1960, Carroll Morgan sold the Siuslaw Oar, which his father had founded, to Dave and Marge Holman. The couple then merged it with their Florence News to form the Siuslaw News. The Holmans sold the paper to their son Paul Holman in 1980 after they retired, and he sold it to News Media Corporation in 2000. The company sold the newspaper in September 2023 to Country Media, Inc.
