= 1962 Oregon Ballot Measure 1 =

Oregon Ballot Measure 1 (1962) was a ballot measure in the U.S. State of Oregon in 1962. It was a constitutional amendment affecting the state militia of Oregon, the Oregon National Guard. The measure changed the constitutional language outlining the organization of the state militia.
