= Lincoln County Leader =

Weekly newspaper published in Newport, Oregon

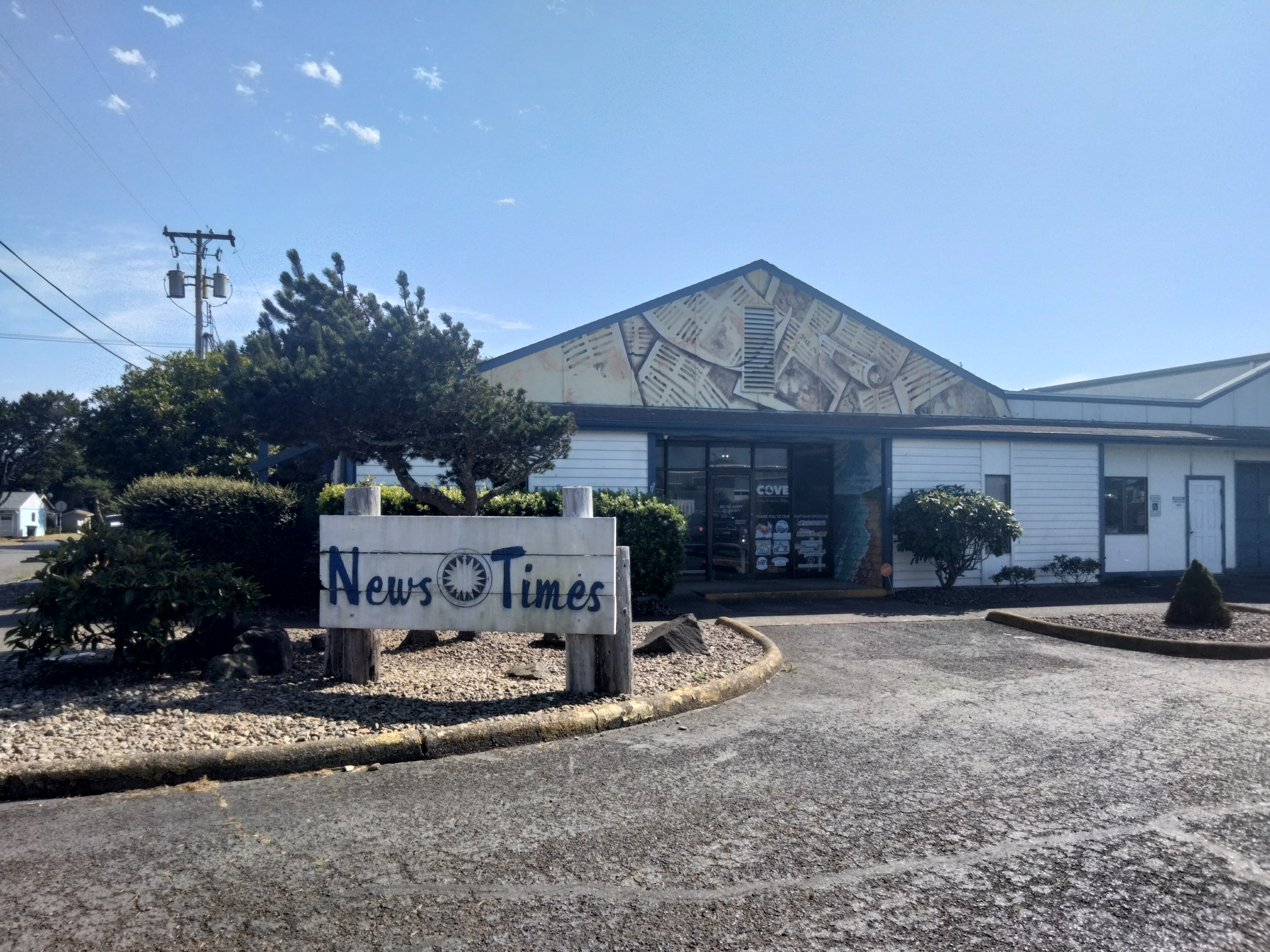
- Entrance to the Lincoln County Leader building located in Newport, Oregon. Seen in 2022 when property was home to the News-Times.
- Type: Weekly newspaper
- Owner: Country Media, Inc.
- Publisher: Joe Warren
- Editor: Jeremy Ruark
- Founded: January 10, 2024; 2 years ago
- Language: English
- Headquarters: P.O. Box 670
- City: Salem, Oregon
- Country: United States
- Website: newportnewstimes.com thenewsguard.com

The Lincoln County Leader is a weekly newspaper based in Newport, Oregon, United States. It was formed in January 2024 by the merger of the Newport News-Times and Lincoln City News Guard, both published by Country Media, Inc. The newspaper takes the name of an earlier publication that existed from 1893 to 1987. The Leader is the newspaper of record for Lincoln County.

== History ==
At least 20 different newspapers have been published in the Lincoln County area. The county's first newspaper was the Yaquina Post, established in 1882 and published in Yaquina City by Collins Van Cleve. In 1889, Van Cleve was also publishing the Scio Press out of Yaquina City. One of the papers, founded in 1886, was called the Newport News, but it was short-lived.

Various newspapers started and closed until 1893, when, in the same year Lincoln County was officially established from part of Benton County, two newspapers were started: the Yaquina Bay News out of Newport, and the Lincoln County Leader out of Toledo. In 1947, Monroe Sweetland, owner of the Molalla Pioneer, purchased the 53-year-old Yaquina Bay News from Doy I. Fruit and the 23-year-old Newport Journal from Harold Perrine. He then combined the two to form the Newport News.

In July 1965, the Newport News Publishing Co. purchased the Lincoln County Times of Waldport following the death of its publisher Dave Hall. The paper was merged that November with the Newport News to form the Newport News-Times. The News-Times bought the Lincoln County Leader about a year later. Both papers were sold by Walter Taylor and Lee Irwin in 1977 to the Democrat-Herald Publishing Co., which published the Albany Democrat-Herald. Capital Cities purchased the company in 1980, which itself was acquired by the Walt Disney Company in 1995. Disney sold its Oregon newspapers to Lee Enterprises in 1997.

The Beach Resort News in Delake started in 1930 and the Lincoln Coast Guard in Nelscott started in 1937. The two merged in 1939 to form the North Lincoln News Guard. In 1965, the name was changed to the Lincoln City News Guard. The paper was purchased in 1967 by Dave Juenke and sold to Scripps-Ifft Newspapers Inc. in 1980. The company sold the newspaper to Swift-Pioneer Publishing Co. in 1983, which later became Swift Communications. A subsidiary called Pacific Coast Newspapers operated the Headlight-Herald, along with the Seaside Signal and The News Guard in Lincoln City. The paper was sold to Oregon Coast Newspapers LLC in February 2003. The business was operated by husband-wife team Joe Happ and Kathleen Newton. The couple sold the paper to Country Media, Inc. in April 2007.

Lee Enterprises sold the Newport News-Times in September 2007 to News Media Corporation. The paper was sold again In 2023 to Country Media, Inc. In January 2024, Country Media merged the Newport News-Times and Lincoln City News Guard into a single newspaper named after the Lincoln County Leader, which had published for 94 years from 1893 to 1987. The plan was first announced in the previous October.
