= Capital Cities/ABC =

Predecessor to Walt Disney Television

Capital Cities/ABC Inc.
- Formerly: Hudson Valley Broadcasting Company; (1946–1959); Capital Cities Broadcasting; (1959–1973); Capital Cities Communications; (1973–1985)
- Type: Public
- Traded as: NYSE: CCB
- Industry: Radio broadcasting, television broadcasting, publishing, recording
- Predecessor: American Broadcasting Companies, Inc.
- Founded: April 5, 1946; 80 years ago
- Founders: Hyman Rosenblum; Lowell Thomas; Frank Smith
- Defunct: September 5, 1996; 30 years ago
- Fate: Acquired and merged into The Walt Disney Company
- Successor: Disney General Entertainment Content; Disney; Disney–ABC Domestic Television; ABC Owned Television Stations
- Headquarters: Albany, New York, U.S.
- Key people: Thomas Murphy (chairman and CEO); Daniel J. Burke (president)

Capital Cities/ABC Inc. was an American media company. It was founded in 1985 when Capital Cities Communications purchased the much larger American Broadcasting Companies, Inc. They were eventually acquired by Disney and re-branded themselves as Disney–ABC Television Group (now Disney Entertainment Television) in 1996.

== History ==
=== Origins ===
Capital Cities/ABC Inc. origins trace back in 1946, when Hyman Rosenblum (1911–1996), a local Albany, New York, businessman (who several years later was a founder of Hudson Valley Community College in Troy), and several investors, including future Congressman Leo William O'Brien and local advertising executive Harry L. Goldman, decided to bid for a new radio station license in Albany. The company was incorporated as Hudson Valley Broadcasting Company on April 5, 1946 when the company received the license for WROW radio in Albany. In October 1953, it opened the Albany-Schenectady-Troy area's second television station, WROW-TV on channel 41. In the late fall of 1954, a group of New York City-based investors, led by famous radio broadcaster and author Lowell Thomas, bought majority control of Hudson Valley Broadcasting from Rosenblum and associates. Thomas' manager/investing partner, Frank Smith became the president of the company.

=== The Capital Cities era ===
In 1956, WROW-TV moved from channel 41 to channel 10 and became WCDA. In 1957, Hudson Valley Broadcasting merged with Durham Broadcasting Enterprises, the owners of WTVD television in Durham, North Carolina (also serving Raleigh). The new company took the name Capital Cities Television Corporation in November 1957, as both WROW/WCDA (now WTEN) and WTVD served the capital cities of their respective states. Capital Cities then began purchasing stations, starting with WPRO-AM-FM-TV in Providence, Rhode Island (another capital city) in 1959. In December 1959, the company's name was changed to Capital Cities Broadcasting.

During the 1960s, Capital Cities' holdings grew with the separate 1961 purchases of WPAT-AM-FM in Paterson, New Jersey, and WKBW radio and WKBW-TV in Buffalo, New York; and of the Goodwill Stations, which included WJR-AM-FM in Detroit, WJRT-TV in Flint, Michigan, and WSAZ-AM-TV in Huntington, West Virginia (also serving the state's capital, Charleston), in 1964. CapCities entered the Los Angeles market in 1966 with its purchase of KPOL (later KZLA and now the present-day KMPC) and KPOL-FM (later KZLA-FM and now KLLI). As a result of the Goodwill Stations purchase, and to adhere to Federal Communications Commission rules limiting ownership of VHF television stations to five per company, Capital Cities spun off WJRT-TV to Poole Broadcasting, a company owned by former CapCities shareholder John B. Poole. Poole's own Poole Broadcasting firm would later purchase two other television stations from CapCities: the second was WPRO-TV (now WPRI-TV) in 1967, coinciding with CapCities' purchase of KTRK-TV in Houston from the Houston Chronicle in June of that year.

In 1968, Capital Cities entered the publishing business by acquiring Fairchild Publications, publisher of several magazines including Women's Wear Daily. The following year the firm purchased its first newspaper, The Oakland Press of Pontiac, Michigan.

The following year, the company made another big purchase—acquiring WFIL-AM-FM-TV in Philadelphia, WNHC-AM-FM-TV in New Haven, Connecticut (also serving the state's capital, Hartford), and KFRE-AM-FM-TV in Fresno, California, from Triangle Publications, as well as its syndicated television unit Triangle Program Sales. Capital Cities would immediately sell the radio stations to new owners, and, so as to comply with an FCC rule in place then that prohibited TV and radio stations in the same market, but different ownership from sharing the same callsigns, changed the television stations' calls to WPVI-TV, WTNH-TV, and KFSN-TV respectively. The acquisitions of WPVI and WTNH gave them seven VHF stations, two stations over the FCC limit at the time, and WTEN and WSAZ-TV were respectively spun off by CapCities to Poole Broadcasting and Lee Enterprises not long after the Triangle purchase was finalized. After the sale was consummated, its syndicated unit was renamed to Capital Cities Television Productions (aka Capital Cities TV Productions and Capital Cities Productions). Charles Keller was named general manager of the unit. WSAZ radio in Huntington was divested to Stoner Broadcasting (it is now WRVC), also as a result of the Triangle deal. To reflect the diversity of their holdings, the company changed its name to Capital Cities Communications on May 4, 1973.

In 1974, Capital Cities bought WBAP and KSCS-FM in Fort Worth, Texas, along with its purchase of the Fort Worth Star-Telegram. The firm also increased its newspaper and publishing holdings during the middle-1970s. In 1974, Capital Cities acquired the Oregon-based Jackson Newspapers chain, which included the Albany Democrat-Herald, the Ashland Daily Tidings, and several other local newspapers and magazines. The Kansas City (Missouri) Star was acquired in 1977, and the following year CapCities bought Times Leader of Wilkes-Barre, Pennsylvania.

In 1977, the company was a lead plaintiff in a lawsuit by the owners of Buffalo-based TV stations against the Canadian Radio-television and Telecommunications Commission over that country's simultaneous substitution rules. The Supreme Court of Canada ruled against the broadcasters. From 1978 to 1985, just before it bought ABC, Capital Cities Communications produced a series of family specials distributed through its syndicated unit.

Returning to broadcasting, WBIE-FM (now WKHX-FM) in Marietta, Georgia (near Atlanta, another capital city), was bought in 1981. WROW radio in Albany, the company's first station, and its FM counterpart (which is now WYJB) were sold in 1983, and in 1984 the company made its last pre-ABC-merger purchases with independent station WFTS-TV in Tampa, Florida, and KLAC radio in Los Angeles (concurrent with the sale of KZLA).

=== Capital Cities/ABC ===
On March 18, 1985, Capital Cities announced that it would purchase ABC for $3.5 billion, which shocked the media industry, as ABC was some four times bigger than Capital Cities was at the time. Berkshire Hathaway chairman Warren Buffett helped to finance the deal in exchange for a 25% share in the combined company. The deal was, at the time, the largest non-oil merger in world business history. However, this record would be surpassed by year's end by the merger of General Electric and RCA (the latter company then being the parent company of rival network NBC).

The newly merged company, known as Capital Cities/ABC (or CapCities/ABC), was forced to sell off some stations due to FCC ownership limits. Between them, ABC and CapCities owned more television stations than FCC rules allowed at the time. Also, the two companies owned several radio stations in the same markets. Of the former Capital Cities television stations, the new company opted to keep the outlets in Philadelphia, Houston, Durham, and Fresno. WFTS and ABC's WXYZ-TV in Detroit were divested as a pair to the E. W. Scripps Company's broadcasting division (then known as Scripps-Howard Broadcasting). WTNH and WKBW-TV were sold separately to minority-owned companies; WKBW-TV would eventually be acquired by E.W. Scripps by 2014. WTNH would have been sold in any event due to a significant signal overlap with ABC flagship WABC-TV in New York City. At the time, the FCC normally did not allow companies to own two television stations with common coverage areas (known commonly as the "one-to-a-market" rule), and would not even consider granting a waiver for a city-grade overlap.

The merged company could have been forced to sell off WPVI as well due to a large Grade B signal overlap with WABC-TV. Citing CBS' ownership of television stations in New York City (WCBS-TV) and Philadelphia (at the time WCAU-TV) under grandfathered status, Capital Cities/ABC requested, and was granted a permanent waiver from the FCC allowing it to keep WPVI-TV. Had the waiver request been denied, WXYZ-TV would have been retained.

WPVI-TV and KTRK-TV had long been ABC affiliates (in fact, two of ABC's strongest affiliates), while WTVD and KFSN-TV, longtime CBS affiliates, respectively switched to ABC in August and September 1985.

On the radio side, new owners were found for CapCities' WPAT stations (Park Communications was the buyer), WKBW (Price Communications, the new owner, changed its call letters to WWKB, which was necessitated due to an FCC regulation in effect then that forbade TV and radio stations in the same city, but with different owners from sharing the same call letters) and KLAC and KZLA-FM (to Malrite Communications), and ABC's WRIF-FM in Detroit (to a minority-owned concern), among others.

The merger was completed on January 3, 1986. Capital Cities/ABC retained ABC's radio and television combinations in New York City (WABC, WABC-TV and WPLJ), Los Angeles (KABC, KABC-TV and KLOS), Chicago (WLS, WLS-FM and WLS-TV), and San Francisco (KGO and KGO-TV), along with WMAL and WRQX-FM in Washington, D.C.; CapCities' aforementioned television outlets and the Detroit, Providence, Marietta and Fort Worth radio stations; Fairchild Publications; the Fort Worth Star-Telegram and the Kansas City Star; and other broadcasting and publishing properties. Orbis Communications immediately purchased the syndication rights to the Capital Cities production library. The library was then leased to pay cable channel HBO for two years for its Family Specials library of 26 titles.

In May 1991, Capital Cities/ABC's Farm Progress Cos. closed its purchase of Harcourt Brace Jovanovich Inc.'s 12-magazine farm publishing group. In 1992, Capital Cities/ABC sold Word Inc.'s music and book publishing to Thomas Nelson. In 1992, ABC launched its new home video unit ABC Video, which was headed by former Vestron Video employee Jon Peisinger. In February 1993, the company formed a television production joint venture with Brillstein-Grey Entertainment to tap into their managed talent and to take advantage of relaxed production regulations. In July, CC/ABC purchased a majority ownership in animation studio DIC Animation City, forming a joint venture called DIC Entertainment L.P. Later in July, CC/ABC reorganized into 4 groups, ABC TV Network Group, CC/ABC Publishing Group, the CC/ABC Broadcast Group, and a newly formed CC/ABC Multimedia Group overseeing the network, magazines & newspapers, stations and new technology & miscellaneous operations respectively. Network Group president Bob Iger was also promoted to executive president of CC/ABC. Also in 1993, ABC launched a new video line Signet Video, which were designed to release feature films for theatrical release or telemovies. It was subsequently changed its name to Summa Video, and signed a deal with Paramount Home Video to handle distribution of the titles.

In 1994, CC/ABC agreed to a $200 million seven-year television production joint venture with the original DreamWorks live-action studio. Also that year, CC/ABC formed a partnership with Brillstein/Grey Entertainment to launch Brillstein/Grey Communications.

The Walt Disney Company announced that it would acquire Capital Cities/ABC in 1995. This merger of equals led to the formation of a new subsidiary, ABC, Inc., on September 19, 1996. The merger did not include the Farm Progress publishing assets, which were spun off to foreign interests in 1997. Other publishing assets were likewise divested to other companies.

== Structure at Disney acquisition ==
- ABC Television Network Group
  - ABC News
  - ABC Sports
  - ABC Entertainment
  - ABC Daytime
  - ABC Children's Programming
- CC/ABC Broadcasting Group
  - ABC Radio Network
  - eight TV stations
  - 21 radio stations
- ABC Cable and International Broadcast Group
  - ESPN Inc. (80%)
    - Eurosport (33.3%, England)
    - TV Sport (10%, France; Eurosport affiliate)
    - The Japan Sports Channel (20%)
  - A&E Television Networks (37.5%)
  - Lifetime Television (50%)
  - Tele-Munich Television Media Participation LP (50%, Germany, with Tele München Gruppe)
    - RTL2 20%
  - Hamster Productions (33%, France)
- DIC Entertainment (Limited Partnerships with Andy Heyward)
  - DIC Entertainment, L.P. (100%)
  - DIC Productions, L.P. (95%)
  - Scandinavian Broadcasting System (23%, Luxembourg)
- CC/ABC Publishing Group
  - Fairchild Publications
  - Chilton Publications
  - multiple newspapers from a dozen dailies and more weeklies
    - Ft. Worth Star-Telegram
    - The Kansas City Star
    - Belleville News-Democrat
    - Times Leader
    - Pacific Northwest Group
      - Albany Democrat-Herald
      - Ashland Daily Tidings
      - The Sandy Post
      - Lebanon Express
      - Cottage Grove Sentinel
      - The Outlook
      - News-Times (Newport)
    - The Oakland Press
  - dozens more publications in the fields of business and law trade journals
  - Farm Progress
  - Los Angeles Magazine
  - Institutional Investor
- CC/ABC Multimedia Group
  - Creative Wonders (Joint-venture with Electronic Arts)

== Former stations ==
- Stations are arranged in alphabetical order by state and city of license.
- Two boldface asterisks appearing following a station's call letters (**) indicate a station built and signed on by Capital Cities Communications or a predecessor.

Stations owned by Capital Cities Communications
| Media market | State | Station | Purchased | Sold | Notes |
|---|---|---|---|---|---|
| Fresno | California | KFSN-TV | 1971 | 1986 | |
| Los Angeles | California | KLAC | 1984 | 1986 | |
| Los Angeles | California | KZLA | 1966 | 1984 | (Note: Known as KPOL prior to 1979.) |
| Los Angeles | California | KZLA-FM | 1966 | 1986 | (Note: Known as KPOL-FM prior to 1978.) |
| New Haven–Hartford | Connecticut | WTNH-TV | 1971 | 1986 | |
| Tampa–St. Petersburg | Florida | WFTS-TV | 1984 | 1986 | |
| Atlanta | Georgia | WKHX | 1985 | 1986 | |
| Atlanta | Georgia | WKHX-FM | 1981 | 1986 | |
| Flint–Saginaw–Bay City | Michigan | WJRT-TV | 1964 | 1964 | |
| Detroit | Michigan | WJR | 1964 | 1986 | |
| Detroit | Michigan | WJR-FM | 1964 | 1986 | (Note: Known as WHYT from 1983 onward.) |
| Albany–Schenectady | New York | WROW | 1947 | 1983 | |
| Albany–Schenectady | New York | WROW-FM ** | 1966 | 1983 | |
| Albany–Schenectady | New York | WTEN ** | 1953 | 1971 | (Note: Known as WROW-TV prior to 1956, and as WCDA from 1956 to 1957.) |
| Buffalo | New York | WKBW | 1961 | 1986 | |
| Buffalo | New York | WKBW-TV | 1961 | 1986 | |
| New York City | New York | WPAT | 1961 | 1985 | |
| New York City | New York | WPAT-FM | 1961 | 1985 | |
| Durham–Raleigh | North Carolina | WTVD ** | 1957 | 1986 | |
| Philadelphia | Pennsylvania | WPVI-TV | 1971 | 1986 | |
| Providence | Rhode Island | WPRO | 1959 | 1986 | |
| Providence | Rhode Island | WPRO-FM | 1959 | 1986 | |
| Providence | Rhode Island | WPRO-TV | 1959 | 1967 | |
| Fort Worth–Dallas | Texas | WBAP | 1974 | 1986 | |
| Fort Worth–Dallas | Texas | KSCS | 1974 | 1986 | |
| Houston | Texas | KTRK-TV | 1967 | 1986 | |
| Huntington–Charleston | West Virginia | WSAZ | 1964 | 1970 | |
| Huntington–Charleston | West Virginia | WSAZ-TV | 1964 | 1971 | |

== Financial results ==
Annual financial statements of Capital Cities/ABC (1994 and 1995 in millions of U.S. dollars, other years in thousands)
| Year | Revenues | | | Net income | | |
| Year | TV/Radio | Press | Total | TV/Radio | Press | Total |
|---|---|---|---|---|---|---|
| 1983 | 302,785 | 459,510 | 762,295 | 124,696 | 104,034 | 228,730 |
| 1984 | 348,106 | 591,616 | 939,722 | 144,182 | 133,179 | 277,361 |
| 1985 | 378,297 | 642,583 | 1,020,880 | 150,970 | 138,512 | 289,482 |
| 1986 | 3,153,619 (Note: Following the acquisition of ABC) | 970,755 | 4,124,374 | 474,535 | 158,999 | 602,678 |
| 1987 | 3,433,749 | 1,006,597 | 4,440,346 | 632,910 | 146,717 | 745,990 |
| 1988 | 3,749,557 | 1,023,896 | 4,773,453 | 722,171 | 129,720 | 816,029 |
| 1989 | 3,899,898 | 1,057,405 | 4,957,394 | 836,149 | 130,444 | 922,512 |
| 1990 | 4,283,633 | 1,101,969 | 5,385,602 | 830,457 | 132,371 | 923,215 |
| 1991 | 4,329,743 | 1,052,246 | 5,381,989 | 669,708 | 122,905 | 761,233 |
| 1992 | 4,265,561 | 1,078,566 | 5,344,127 | 619,317 | 136,389 | 755,706 |
| 1993 | 4,663,215 | 1,010,438 | 5,673,653 | 778,077 | 125,647 | 903,724 |
| 1994 | 5,277 | 1,102.1 | 6,379.7 | 1,127 | 155 | 1,239 |
| 1995 | 5,727.5 | 1,151.1 | 6,878.5 | 1,164.8 | 139 | 1,238.8 |
Since 1996, Capital Cities/ABC's financial results are included in those of Disney Media Networks.
