= Tillamook Headlight-Herald =

Weekly newspaper published in Tillamook, Oregon

Headlight-Herald
- Type: Weekly newspaper
- Owner: Country Media, Inc.
- Founded: 1888
- Language: English
- Headquarters: 1906 Second Street; Tillamook, OR 97141
- Circulation: 6,621
- ISSN: 2835-5148
- OCLC number: 30721854
- Website: tillamookheadlightherald.com

The Headlight-Herald is a weekly paper published in Tillamook, Oregon, United States, since 1888. It is published on Tuesdays by Country Media, Inc. and has a circulation of 6,621. It is the newspaper of record for Tillamook County.

== History ==
=== Tillamook Headlight ===
On June 8, 1888, the Tillamook Headlight was first published with C. E. Wilson as publisher and J. E. Edwards as editor. It was the first newspaper published in Tillamook County. The name is a reference to the Tillamook Rock Light off the shore of the Tillamook Head. The first issue was sold at auction to C. B. Hadley for $12. The second copy was sold for 5¢. Theodore Steinhilber became editor and publisher in 1889. In August that year, W. F. D. Jones became the owner. B. C. Lamb became a co-owner in December. At that time paper was wealthy from publishing timber notices. It published more notices of applications for entry of land under the Timber and Stone Act than any other paper in Oregon or Washington. The paper was 18 pages for a town of 500 people, making it the largest U.S. paper by size in proportion to the population it served.

In 1891, Thomas Coates ran the paper for a year. In 1895, the Tillamook Headlight Company formed with Jones as president. He edited the paper until he was succeeded by Englishman Fred C. Baker in 1896. He ran the paper until selling out in 1920 to Leslie Harrison and Harold Hamstreet, son of the owner of the Sheridan Sun. At that time it was considered one of the best paying weeklies in the state. Two years later the paper was sold to Eugene Crossby. By December 1922, the paper was reorganized with Harrison as publisher and Wray Stuart as publisher and manager. Baker continued as an editorial writer at the Headlight until 1925. That year A. L. Mallory became editor. He was succeeded in 1927 by Roy Blodgett. In 1928, Irl S. McSherry and George E. Martin, former owners of the McMinnville Telephone Register, bought the Headlight from Blodgett. The paper was later owned by Thomas Walpole and D. A. DeCook.

=== Tillamook Herald ===
In 1889, the Western Watchtower was founded as second newspaper in Tillamook County. For about a year the paper was jointly owned by J. L. Johnson and Cato Sullivan. The paper ceased within two years and the printing plant was acquired in 1892 by John J. Stoddard and A. G. Reynolds to begin publishing the Tillamook Advocate.

In 1894, T. B. Handley became editor. The name was changed to the Tillamook Herald in 1896 by R. M. Watson, who had purchased the paper from George A. Edmunds. Watson sold his nephew Rollie W. Watson a half interest. In 1907, Charles A. Dolan and J. L. Murphy purchased the Herald. They turned it back to Rollie W. Watson a year later. He operated the paper for a few months until N. T. Pentreath became publisher, who quit after a few months. Watson sold the paper in 1908 to C. E. Trombley. He published the paper for 15 years until selling it in August 1923 to Allan McComb and Fred T. Mellinger. A year later McComb sold his interest to Arne Rae, who retired in 1929.

=== Headlight-Herald ===
The Headlight and the Herald merged in 1934 to form the Headlight-Herald, with Thomas Walpole and D. M. DeCook as publishers. In 1960, Elsie W. DeCook sold the paper to E.C. McKinney and her son Vern McKinney (owners of The Hillsboro Argus) and Philip N. Bladine (owner of the McMinnville Telephone-Register). The Headlight-Herald was sold in 1973 to Dave Juenke, Walter Taylor and Lee Irwin. In 1980, Juenke sold the paper to Scripps-Ifft Newspapers Inc. The company sold the newspaper to Swift-Pioneer Publishing Co. in 1983, which later became Swift Communications. A subsidiary called Pacific Coast Newspapers operated the Headlight-Herald, along with the Seaside Signal and The News Guard in Lincoln City. In February 2003, the Headlight-Herald and News Guard were purchased by Oregon Coast Newspapers LLC, operated by husband-wife team Joe Happ and Kathleen Newton. The couple sold them in April 2007 to Country Media, Inc.
