= The World (Coos Bay, Oregon) =

Weekly newspaper published in Coos Bay, Oregon

- Type: Weekly newspaper
- Format: Broadsheet
- Owner: Country Media, Inc.
- Publisher: Joe Warren
- Editor: Nate Schwartz
- Founded: 1878 (as The Coast Mail)
- Language: English
- Headquarters: Coos Bay, OR 97420; United States
- ISSN: 1062-8495
- OCLC number: 23861115
- Website: theworldlink.com

The World is a weekly newspaper in Coos Bay, Oregon, United States. From Coos Bay, The World serves Oregon's South Coast, including the cities of Coos Bay, North Bend, Reedsport, Bandon, Lakeside, Coquille and Myrtle Point.

== History ==
In 1878, The Coast Mail was founded by Webster & Hacker in Marshfield. Percy C. Levar and Frank Hofer, both former Capital Journal staff, purchased the Mail in 1901. The two soon launched the Daily Mail, county's first daily newspaper with limited AP Wire service.

In 1906, brothers Gus and Ernest Kramer purchased The Coast Mail from Levar and merged it with their Marshfield Advertiser to form The Coos Bay Times. In 1907, brothers Michael C. and Dan E. Maloney took over the paper.

In 1928, E. G. Murray purchased the paper from the Maloney brothers. Two years later he sold a controlling interest to Sheldon F. Sackett. In 1957, Sackett changed the paper's name from The Times to The World. Sheldon died in 1968. His heirs sold The World to Scripps League Newspapers in 1973.

The company was acquired by Pulitzer Newspapers Inc. in 1996, who then purchased the nearby Bandon Western World in 2003 and Umpqua Post in 2004. Pulitzer was acquired by Lee Enterprises in 2005.

In January 2015, The World launched a new weekly newspaper for the Coquille area called the Coquille Valley Courant, but it ceased that same year on December 29.

In 2020, the paper was sold by Lee to Country Media, Inc. About six months later The World announced it will reduce its print schedule from five days a week to two due to the COVID-19 pandemic in the United States. The Bandon Western World soon ceased, along with the Umpqua Post. In October 2021, The World moved its office from Commercial Avenue to Anderson Avenue.

== Awards ==
The World won 15 awards in the 2014 Oregon Newspaper Publishers Association 2014 Better Newspaper Contest, including first place statewide for Best Online Coverage of Breaking News, beating both The Oregonian and the (Medford) Mail Tribune.
