= Cottage Grove Sentinel =

Weekly newspaper published in Cottage Grove, Oregon

- Type: Weekly newspaper
- Owner: Country Media, Inc.
- Publisher: Joe Warren
- Editor: Cindy Wood-Weeldreyer
- Founded: 1889
- Language: English
- Headquarters: 388 State St #800, Salem, OR
- Circulation: 2,829
- ISSN: 3065-3789
- OCLC number: 1099471502
- Website: cgsentinel.com

The Cottage Grove Sentinel is a weekly newspaper serving the city of Cottage Grove, Oregon, United States. It was established in 1889 and is published on Wednesdays with a circulation of 2,829.

== History ==
The earliest newspaper in Cottage Grove was the Cottage Grove Leader, which was first published on July 15, 1889. It was printed in Drain, Oregon using a military style press by E.P. Thorp, who at the time was publisher of the Drian Echo established four years earlier. On October 12 of the same year, F. W. Chausse moved the paper's operations to Cottage Grove. Thorp bought out Chausse in 1895 and merged his two paper's together to form the Echo-Leader.

On November 30, 1895, during the height of a town feud, when the western side of town briefly changed their name to Lemati, the newspaper adopted both of the names Cottage Grove and Lemati Echo Leader for a single run. Only one edition was printed after a two-and-a-half-month absence from the publication of the Echo-Leader. When publication resumed, the Cottage Grove and Lemati Echo-Leader shortened its name, and was stylized only as The Leader.

Thorp died in February 1897 and the paper was taken over by L. F. Wooley, who changed the name back to the Leader. C. W. Wallace became the paper's owner four years later and he was followed by W. C. Conner in 1903. He sold it a year later to A. Clifford Gage, who that same year sold the paper to a cooperation owned by several local businessmen. In 1905, the paper changed to a semi-weekly and was renamed to the Lane County Leader. Two years later the owners bought the Bohemia Nugget, originally established as the Messenger in 1897, and absorbed it into the Leader.

C. J. Howard established the Western Oregon in 1905. He sold it to D. W. and I. S. Bath in 1908. Lew A. Cates became the new proprietor and changed its name to the Cottage Grove Sentinel on Oct. 2, 1909. Elbert Bede purchased The Sentinel on Sept. 11, 1911. He and W. H. Tyrrell, owner of The Leader, merged their two papers together in July 1915. Bede acquired full-ownership of the Cottage Grove Sentinel in October 1915 after buying out Tyrrell. He operated the paper for a quarter-century until he sold his ownership stake in 1936 to Judge Leonard S. Godard, who was a former associate justice on the Supreme Court of the Philippines. A. W. Shofstall maintained his 20% ownership stake at the time.

Two years later both men sold the paper to W. C. Martin. His family operated the Sentinel until selling it in 1961 to Elmo Smith who co-owned the Democrat-Herald Publishing Co., which published the Albany Democrat-Herald. Capital Cities purchased the company in 1980, which itself was acquired by The Walt Disney Company in 1995. Disney sold its Oregon newspapers to Lee Enterprises in 1997. Lee sold the Cottage Grove Sentinel to News Media Corporation in 2006, who in turn sold it to Country Media, Inc. in 2023. After 137 years of publication, the newspaper announced it will publish it's final issue on Oct. 28, 2026.

== See also ==
- Daniel Gault
