= Paso Robles Press =

Newspaper in Paso Robles, California

The Paso Robles Press
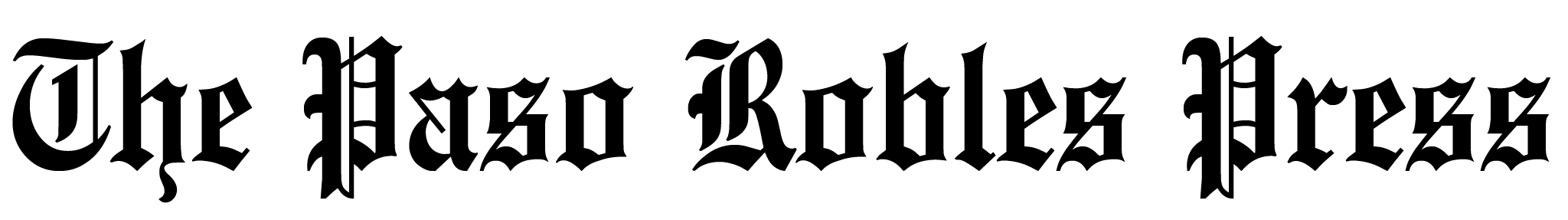

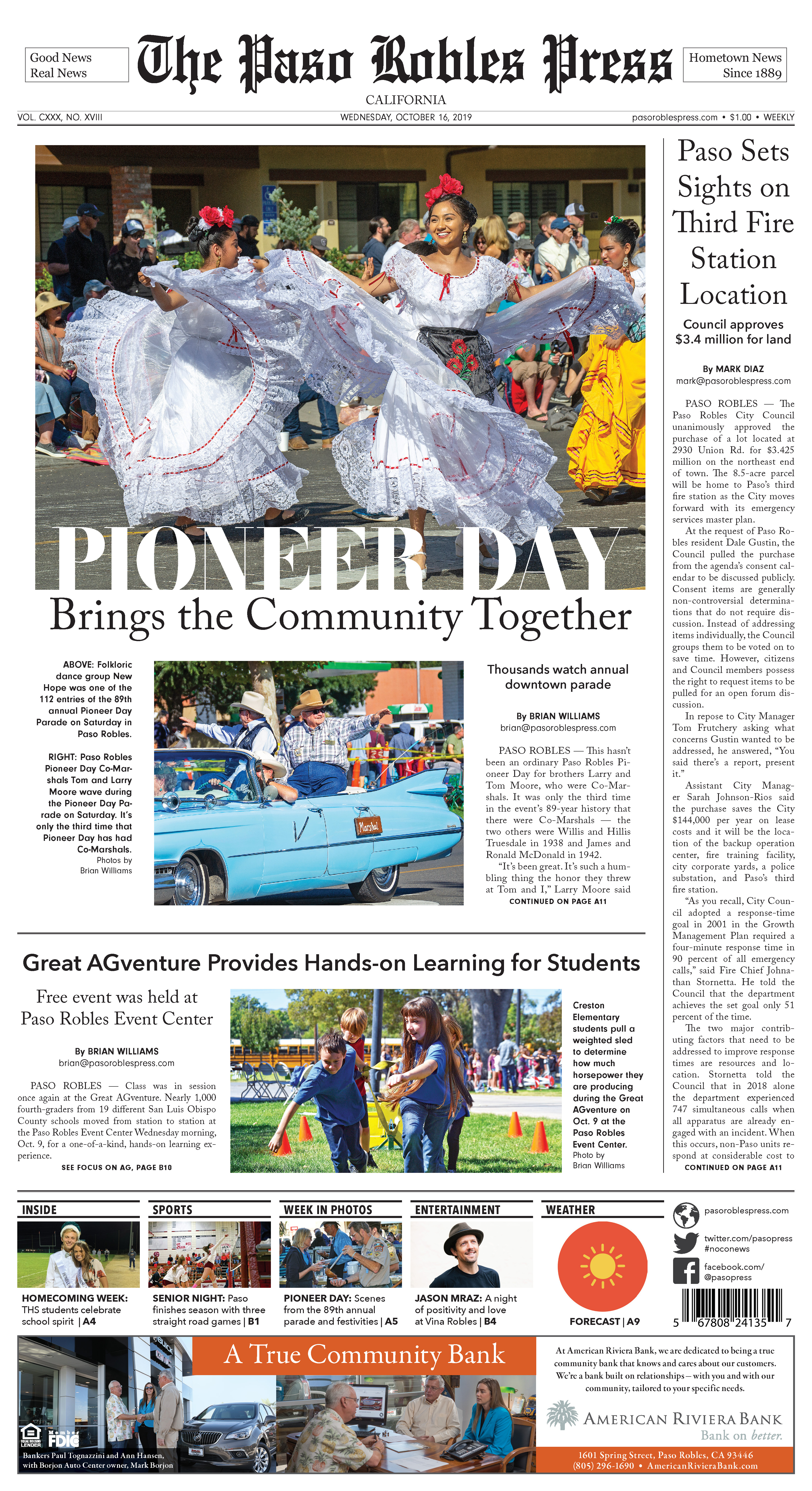
- Type: Weekly newspaper
- Format: Broadsheet
- Owner: 13 Stars Media
- Publisher: Hayley Mattson
- Editor: Melissa Mattson
- Founded: 1886
- Language: English
- Headquarters: 945 Spring Street, Suite 11; Paso Robles, California 93446
- Circulation: 3,142
- Sister newspapers: Atascadero News
- ISSN: 1536-1748
- OCLC number: 44104167
- Website: pasoroblespress.com

The Paso Robles Press is a weekly printed newspaper and daily online publication based in Paso Robles, California, United States that serves the residents of northern San Luis Obispo County. It is operated by 13 Stars Media, with a readership primarily in Paso Robles and surrounding communities, including Templeton, San Miguel and Shandon.

== History ==
On Nov. 13, 1886, the first edition of the Paso Robles Leader was published. In 1915, L.B. Lawrence started the Paso Robles Press. He bought the Paso Robles Record in 1918, and the Paso Robles Leader from H.G. Wright in 1919. Both papers were absorbed into the Press. Lawrence sold the Press in 1921 to A.B. Butterworth, former owner of the Pittsburgh Dispatch. He sold it back to Lawrence in 1922.

At some point Griffin Smith, acquired the paper. In 1925, he sold it to George N. Weaver. Three years later the paper was sold again by Fred J. Smith and Fred W. Smith to Donald D. Campbell. In 1930, Campbell petitioned the government to un-adjudicate a rival paper after it changed its name from The Spotlight to the Paso Robles Spotlight, arguing they were two different papers. A year later the Spotlight closed and Campbell purchased its subscription list.

In 1956, Fred. E. Weybret, owner of the La Grande Observer, purchased the newspaper from Thomas J. Barry, and he sold it three years later to Arthur C. Youngberg. In 1966, James J. McGiffin, editor of the Red Bluff Daily News, acquired the Press. It was sold a year later to Ben Reddick.

In 1996, Central Valley Publishing Inc., an affiliate of USMedia Group of Crystal City, Missouri, bought the Press from the Reddick family. At the time it had a circulation of 5,000. In April 2000, the paper eliminated its Friday edition. In 2002, News Media Corporation acquired and Press, and the Atascadero News a year later. In 2019, the company sold both papers to Nicholas and Hayley Mattson.
