= Statesman Journal =

Daily newspaper published in Salem, Oregon

- The July 27, 2005, front page of the Statesman Journal
- Type: Daily newspaper
- Format: Broadsheet
- Owner: USA Today Co.
- Publisher: Ryan Kedzierski
- Editor: Cherrill Crosby
- Founded: 1851 (as Oregon Statesman)
- Headquarters: 340 Vista Ave. SE; Salem, OR 97301; USA
- Circulation: 27,859 Mon-Tue, Thur; 33,815 Wed. 36,323 Sun
- ISSN: 0739-5507
- Website: statesmanjournal.com

The Statesman Journal is the major daily newspaper published in Salem, Oregon, United States. Founded in 1851 as the Oregon Statesman, it later merged with the Capital Journal to form the current newspaper, the second-oldest in Oregon. The Statesman Journal is distributed in Salem, Keizer, and portions of the mid-Willamette Valley. The average weekday circulation was 27,859, with Sunday's readership listed at 36,323, in 2012. It is owned, along with the neighboring Stayton Mail and Silverton Appeal Tribune, by the national USA Today Co.

== History ==
=== Oregon Statesman ===
The Oregon Statesman was founded by Samuel Thurston, the first delegate from the Oregon Territory to the US Congress. His editor and co-founder was Asahel Bush; the paper was a Democratic Party response to the Whig-controlled Portland-based paper, The Oregonian. The first issue was dated March 28, 1851, printed on a hand press in Oregon City, the provincial capital from 1848 to 1851.

Thurston died on April 9 of that year while returning from the nation's capital to the Territory, and Bush then assumed ownership of the paper. The territorial capital was relocated to Salem later that year, so by 1853 the printing operation was transferred to Salem. When the territorial capital was relocated to Corvallis in 1855, the printing process also moved there, but that decision was quickly reversed and the capital reverted to Salem. The printing operation also relocated to Salem in the late fall of 1855.

The paper was used as a mouthpiece of the Democratic Party and of the Salem Clique that ran the party in Salem. Bush vividly criticized rival editors and political figures. Bush and Oregonian editor Thomas J. Dryer are recognized as fomenting a virulent editorial rivalry.

As warclouds gathered over the young nation, the Democratic Party generally favored the South and Secession. Bush, however, sided with the Union cause, and this rift considerably weakened the paper's relevance in territorial politics. As a result, Bush left the paper in 1863 and entered the banking field. The paper was renamed Salem Statesman, and lost much of its partisan slant. It ceased publication in 1866, but resumed in 1869 under the guidance of editor Samuel Asahel Clarke and titled The Statesman and Unionist. The 'Unionist' was soon dropped from the title, and Clarke sold the paper in 1872. For 18 months in 1883–84, 50% of the newspaper was owned by William H. Byars, the former publisher of the Roseburg Plaindealer (1873–83) who was nominated as State Printer in late 1882 and elected in 1883. In 1884 R. J. Hendricks became the paper's manager and editor, positions he held for 44 years. Ownership passed to Jasper Wilkins and Alonzo Gesner, with Gesner selling out his part within a year. In 1929 the paper was sold to Charles A. Sprague (two-thirds interest) and Sheldon Sackett (one-third interest). Sprague had previously published newspapers in Ritzville, Washington and in Corvallis.

Sprague ran for Oregon Governor in 1938, and held that post for one term, leaving the paper in the hands of editor Ralph Curtis and business manager Wendell Wilmarth. When he lost his re-election bid and returned to the paper's helm in 1953, he worked to make it more directly competitive with the city's afternoon newspaper, the Capital-Journal. By 1953 the two papers agreed to share business and production plants while maintaining editorial independence. Sprague died in 1969, leaving his son Wallace to manage the paper from his New York City home.

=== Capital Journal ===
Will H. Parry established the Capital Journal in 1888, with its first issue dated March 1. It was launched as a for-profit venture and an outlet for the Republican Party. By the end of the year, Parry sold the Journal to William H. Byars (who also was elected that year as Salem's City Surveyor), one of many ownership changes in subsequent years. (In 1890, Byars was appointed by Pres. Benjamin Harrison as U.S. Surveyor General for Oregon.)

Around 1918, George Putnam purchased the Capital Journal and served as editor for 30 years before selling to Bernard Mainwaring in 1953. Meanwhile, Charles A. Sprague, who went on to become governor of Oregon, bought the Statesman in 1929. By the 1950s the two editors had agreed that their respective papers should cooperate closely. The Journal moved into the Statesman's new facility and the two papers began sharing printing facilities while keeping independent writers and editors.

=== 1973 sale and merger ===
In 1973, both papers were sold to national publisher Gannett, the company that publishes USA Today. In 1980, they were combined to form the Statesman Journal. Dating to the Statesman's inception, it is the second-oldest Oregon newspaper. The paper won ten first-place awards in the Oregon Newspaper Publishers Association's annual Better Newspaper Contest in 2001, the most in its division. In the 2006 contest, the paper took first place in its division for overall excellence, best editorial page, and best editorial.

== Details ==
The newspaper primarily covers news in the Salem-Keizer metropolitan area in the middle section of the Willamette Valley. Coverage includes state politics, Salem area news, area sports, business news, and lifestyle news. Circulation is focused on Marion and Polk counties with a market size of 410,000 residents, with some additional circulation in neighboring Linn, Lincoln, Yamhill, and Benton counties. In 2008 The Statesman Journal had circulation of 46,826 from Monday through Saturday, and 53,367 Sunday. By 2018, the average daily circulation had declined to 27,859 Monday-Tuesday, Thursday and 33,815 Wednesday, with a Sunday readership of 36,323. The newspaper also published The Stayton Mail of Stayton and the Appeal Tribune of Silverton after purchasing both in 1990 until both publications ceased in 2022.

== See also ==
- List of newspapers in Oregon
- Photograph: Statesman Journal building in Salem
