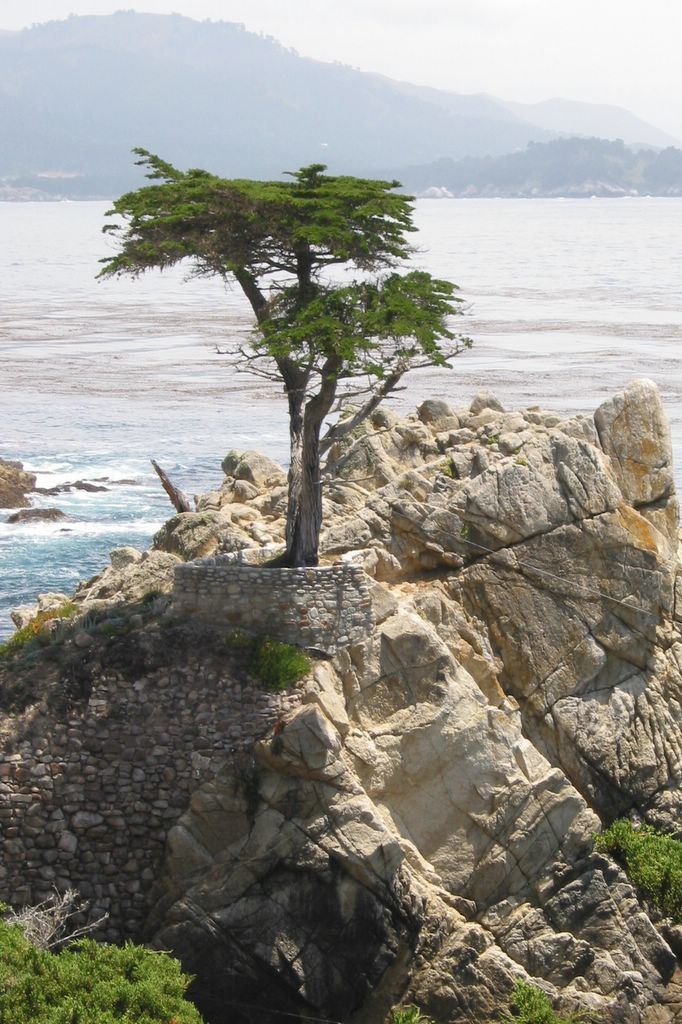
- The "Lone Cypress" near Monterey, California

Conservation status
- Vulnerable (IUCN 3.1)

- Critically Imperiled (NatureServe)

Scientific classification
- Kingdom: Plantae
- Clade: Tracheophytes
- Clade: Gymnosperms
- Division: Pinophyta
- Class: Pinopsida
- Order: Cupressales
- Family: Cupressaceae
- Genus: Hesperocyparis
- Species: H. macrocarpa

Binomial name
- Hesperocyparis macrocarpa (Hartw.) Bartel

Synonyms
- List: Callitropsis macrocarpa (Hartw.) D.P.Little; Cupressus hartwegii Carrière; Cupressus lambertiana Carrière; Cupressus lambertiana var. fastigiata Carrière; Cupressus macrocarpa Hartw.; Cupressus macrocarpa var. angulata Lemmon; Cupressus macrocarpa f. crippsii (R.Sm.) Rehder; Cupressus macrocarpa var. crippsii R.Sm.; Cupressus macrocarpa var. farallonensis Mast.; Cupressus macrocarpa f. fastigiata (Carrière) Rehder; Cupressus macrocarpa var. fastigiata (Carrière) Anon.; Cupressus macrocarpa var. lambertiana (Carrière) Anon.; Cupressus macrocarpa subsp. lobosensis Silba; Cupressus macrocarpa var. lutea Webster; Cupressus macrocarpa f. lutea (Webster) Rehder; Cupressus macrocarpa f. pygmaea A.B.Jacks.; Cupressus macrocarpa variegata Van Geert; Cupressus reinwardtii Beissn.; Neocupressus macrocarpa (Hartw.) de Laub.

= Hesperocyparis macrocarpa =

Monterey cypress

Species of conifer

Hesperocyparis macrocarpa (syn. Cupressus macrocarpa), the Monterey cypress, is a species of coniferous tree in the cypress family, Cupressaceae. It is endemic to California.

The Monterey cypress is found naturally only on the Central Coast of California. Due to being a glacial relict, the natural distributional range of the species during modern times is confined to two small relict populations near Carmel, California, at Cypress Point in Pebble Beach and at Point Lobos. Historically, during the peak of the last ice age, the range of the Monterey cypress would have likely extended much further north and south.

== Description ==
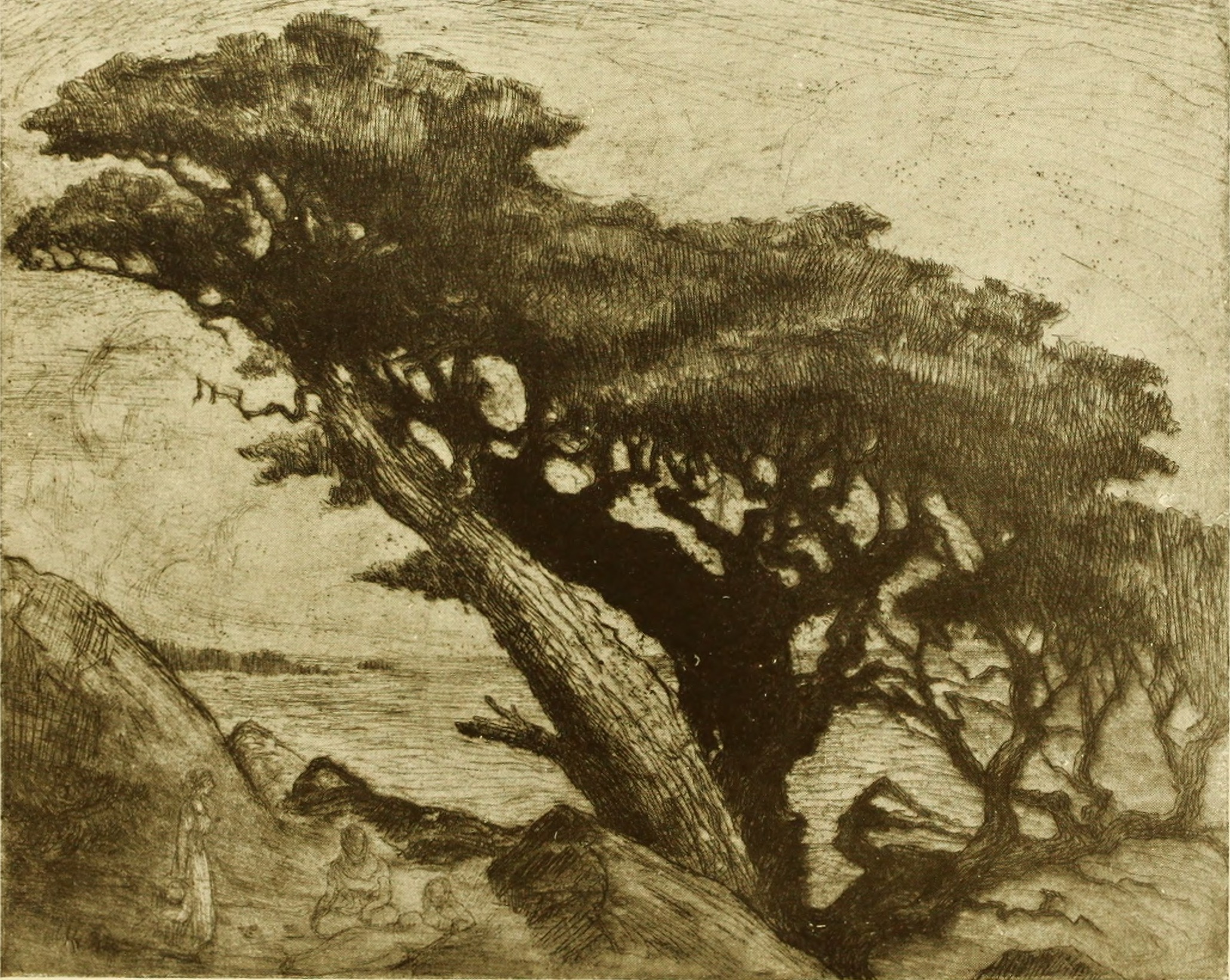
Monterey Cypress near Carmel, Calif., 1916

Hesperocyparis macrocarpa is a medium-sized coniferous evergreen tree, which often becomes irregular and flat-topped as a result of the strong winds that are typical of its native area. It grows to heights of up to 40 meters (133 feet) in perfect growing conditions, and its trunk diameter can reach 2.5 meters (over 8 feet). The foliage grows in dense sprays which are bright green in color and release a deep lemony aroma when crushed. The leaves are scale-like, 2–5 mm long, and produced on rounded (not flattened) shoots; seedlings up to a year old have needle-like leaves 4–8 mm long.

The seed cones are globose to oblong, 20–40 mm long, with 6–14 scales, green at first, maturing brown about 20–24 months after pollination. The pollen cones are 3–5 mm long, and release their pollen in late winter or early spring. The specific epithet macrocarpa (from Greek) means "with large fruit".

Because of the large trunk size some trees develop, people have assumed that individual H. macrocarpa trees may be up to 2,000 years old. However, the longest-lived report based on physical evidence is only 284 years old. The renowned Californian botanist Willis Linn Jepson wrote that "the advertisement of [C. macrocarpa trees] in seaside literature as 1,000 to 2,000 years old does not ... rest upon any actual data, and probably represents a desire to minister to a popular craving for superlatives". Few trees survive beyond 100 years. As a counterpoint to this, many of the earliest introductions of the species into New Zealand around 1860 still survive and the major cause of mortality of these cultivated specimens is felling. One such example is the 160 year old St. Barnabas Church tree in Stoke, Nelson, New Zealand.

== Taxonomy ==
Hesperocyparis macrocarpa was given its first scientific description by the German botanist Karl Theodor Hartweg with the name Cupressus macrocarpa. Hartweg's trip to California coincided with the Mexican–American War. He observed in his report, "Under these circumstances I cannot venture far away from Monterey, nor is it advisable that I should do so, as I might fall in with a party of country people, who could not be persuaded that a person would come all the way from London to look after weeds, which in their opinion are not worth picking up, but might suppose that I have some political object in view; I, therefore, confine my excursions within a few miles of the town." In July 1846 he observed the Monterey cypress trees and named them, though his paper was not received in London until 10 May of the following year.

Along with other New World Cupressus (NWC) species, it was transferred to the genus Hesperocyparis in the 2000s on genetic evidence that the NWC are not very closely related to the Old World Cupressus (OWC) species.

Hesperocyparis macrocarpa is a paleoendemic, with fossilized remains discovered in Drakes Bay and Rancho La Brea evidencing a much larger extent in the past.

Phylogenetic analysis of nuclear DNA sequences and organismic data recover distinct lineages, with the NWC being sister to Juniperus or Juniperus and the OWC. However, chloroplast sequences sometimes place both OWC and NWC with a common ancestor, possibly due to ancient hybridization. Other more obvious morphological differences support their separation, such as the presence of 3 to 5 cotyledons in NWC, as opposed to 2 in Old World species, glaucous seed coats, and monomorphic leaves on ultimate branch segments.

Analysis of phylogenetic relationships show that the species is placed within the Macrocarpa clade, which diverged from the Arizonica clade, both within Hesperocyparis. The two clades are separated biogeographically by the Transverse Ranges, which forms a barrier to any north–south migration of most species within these clades.

== Distribution ==
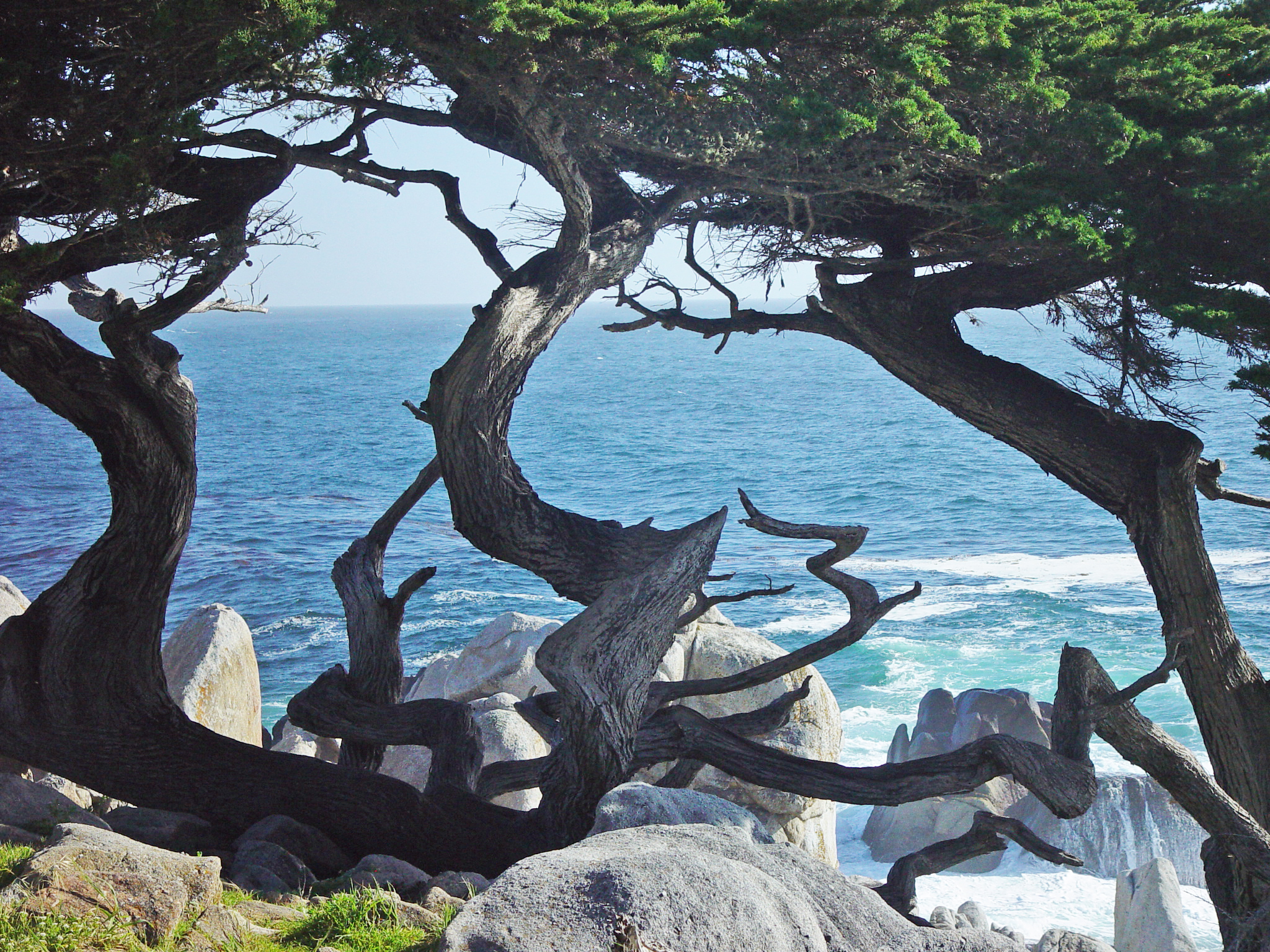
Trees showing the species' typical wind-sculpted habit in its native area

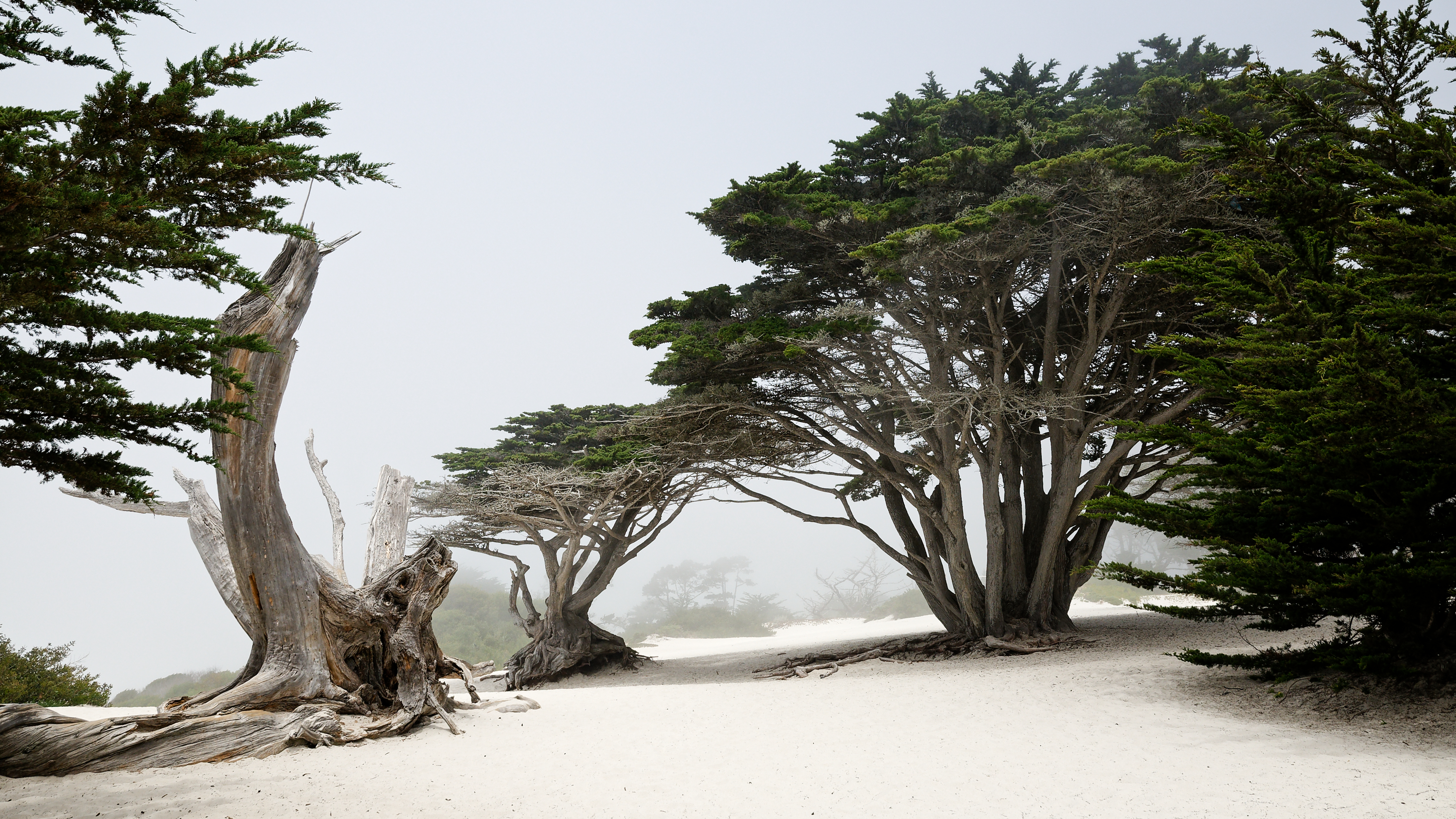
Monterey cypress trees in fog near Carmel Beach, CA, USA

The two native cypress forest stands are protected, within Point Lobos State Natural Reserve and Del Monte Forest. The natural habitat is noted for its cool, moist summers, frequently enveloping the trees in sea fog.

This species has been widely planted outside its native range, particularly along the coasts of California and Oregon. Its European distribution includes Great Britain (including the Isle of Man and the Channel Islands), France, Ireland, Greece, Italy and Portugal. In New Zealand, plantings have naturalized, finding conditions there more favorable than in its native range. It has also been grown experimentally as a timber crop in Kenya.

The tree has been successfully planted in Sri Lanka, with a 130-year old specimen on view at the Hakgala Botanical Garden in Nuwara Eliya.

Hesperocyparis macrocarpa is also grown in South Africa. For example, a copse has been planted to commemorate South African infantrymen who died in the Allied cause in Italy and North Africa during World War 2. As in California, the Cape trees are gnarled and wind-sculpted.

Monterey Cypress has been introduced to the Falkland Islands, where it exists in a small forest at Hill Cove and another at Carcass Island.

== Cultivation and uses ==
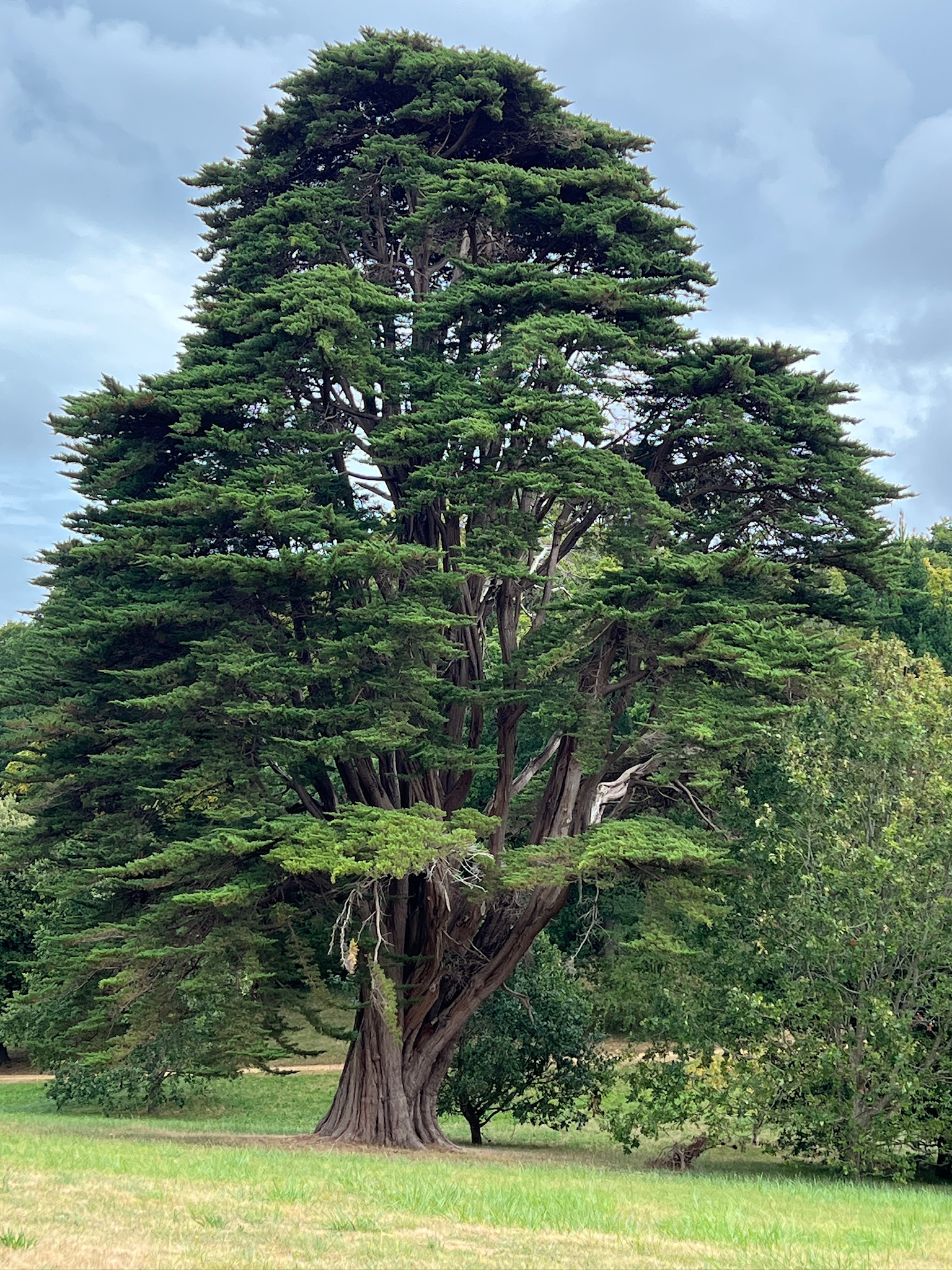
The tallest Monterey cypress on the Isle of Wight, planted in the early 1850s.

Monterey cypress has been widely cultivated away from its native range, both elsewhere along the California coast, and in other areas with similar cool summer, mild winter oceanic climates. It was very early cultivated in the United Kingdom. In 1846 Karl Hartweg sent the Royal Horticultural Society seeds along with a report on his journeys in California. It is a popular private garden and public landscape tree in California. It is so widely planted in Golden Gate Park that the silhouette of the tree is sometimes printed as a symbol of the park.

When planted in areas with hot summers, for example in interior California away from the coastal fog belt, Monterey cypress has proved highly susceptible to cypress canker, caused by the fungus Seiridium cardinale, and rarely survives more than a few years. This disease is not a problem where summers are cool.

The foliage is slightly toxic to livestock and can cause miscarriages in cattle. Sawn logs are used by many craftspeople, some boat builders and small manufacturers, as a furniture structural material and a decorative wood because of its fine colours, though it must be preserved carefully to prevent the wood from splitting. It is also a fast, hot burning, albeit sparky (therefore not suited to open fires), firewood.

=== In Oceania ===
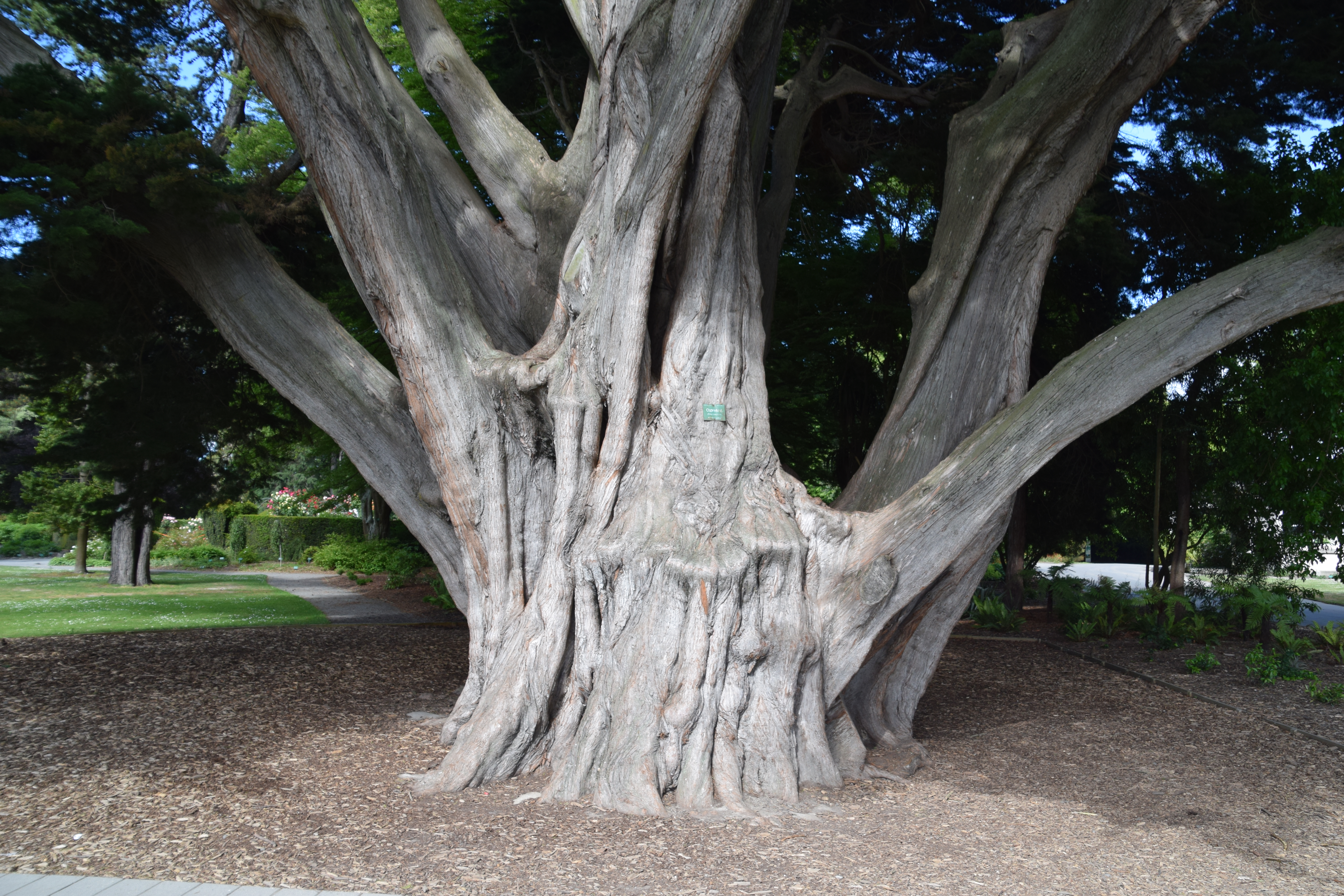
Large Cupressus macrocarpa in Christchurch Botanic Gardens, New Zealand

In Australia and New Zealand, where the tree is simply called macrocarpa, the tree and its cultivars are frequently grown as a windbreak tree on farms, usually in rows or shelter belts. The species is also planted in New Zealand as an ornamental tree and, occasionally, as a timber tree. There, finding more favorable growing conditions than in its native range, and in the absence of many native pathogens, it often grows much larger, with trees recorded at over 40 m (130 ft) tall and 3 m (9.8 ft) in trunk diameter. One specimen – with a trunk diameter of more than 4.6 m (15 ft) – is considered to be the largest recorded single-stemmed specimen in the world. Macrocarpa timber was used for fence posts on New Zealand farms before electric fencing became popular.

=== Cultivars ===
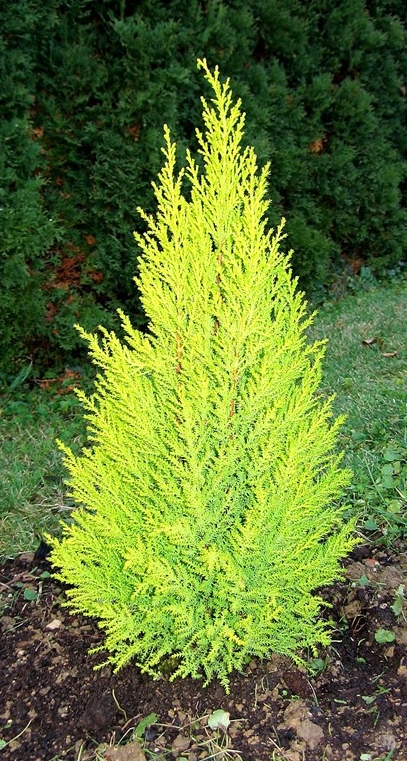
Cupressus macrocarpa 'Goldcrest'

A number of cultivars have been selected for garden use, including Goldcrest, with yellow-green, semi-juvenile foliage (with spreading scale-leaf tips) and Lutea with yellow-green foliage. Goldcrest has gained the Royal Horticultural Society's Award of Garden Merit (confirmed 2017).

Monterey cypress is one of the parents of the fast-growing cultivated hybrid Leyland cypress, Cupressus × Leylandii, the other parent being Nootka cypress (Callitropsis nootkatensis).

Hesperocyparis macrocarpa cultivars grown in New Zealand are:

- 'Aurea Saligna'—long cascades of weeping, golden-yellow, thread-like foliage on a pyramidal tree
- 'Brunniana Aurea'—pillar or conical form with soft rich-golden foliage
- 'Gold Rocket'—narrow erect form with golden colouring, slow-growing
- 'Golden Pillar'—compact conical tree with dense yellow shoots and foliage
- 'Greenstead Magnificent'—dwarf form with blue-green foliage
- 'Lambertiana Aurea'—hardy upright form tolerating poor soil and climate conditions

=== Traditional medicine ===
Ohlone people are reported to have used the foliage in a decoction as a remedy for rheumatism.

== Chemistry ==
Isocupressic acid, a labdane diterpenoid, is an abortifacient component of H. macrocarpa. Monoterpenes (α- and γ-terpinene and terpinolene) are constituents of the foliage volatile oil. The oil exact composition is : α-pinene (20.2%), sabinene (12.0%), p-Cymene (7.0%) and terpinen-4-ol (29.6%). Unusual sesquiterpenes can be found in the foliage. Longiborneol (also known as juniperol or macrocarpol) can also be isolated from Monterey cypresses.
