= Susan Slusser =

American sportswriter (born 1967)

- Born: 1967 (age 58–59)
- Education: Stevenson School, Pebble Beach, California
- Occupation: sportswriter
- Awards: Sportswriters of the Year in 2019; Northern California Area Emmy Award

Susan Slusser is an American sportswriter who works for the San Francisco Chronicle, covering the San Francisco Giants of Major League Baseball. She was the first woman to serve as president of the Baseball Writers' Association of America.

== Early life ==
Slusser graduated from Stevenson School in Pebble Beach, California, where she did play-by-play announcing for the school radio station. She is a 1988 graduate of Stanford University, with a double major in English and history. While at Stanford, she was the sports editor of the Stanford Daily and played lacrosse. She also called play-by-play Stanford baseball for the campus radio station, including the College World Series, and served as a color commentator for football.

== Career ==
Slusser previously worked for the Dallas Morning News in 1995 and 1996, covering the Texas Rangers of Major League Baseball (MLB). She also served as a beat writer in the National Basketball Association. She worked in Sacramento, California for the Sacramento Bee, where she covered the Sacramento Kings, and Orlando, Florida for the Orlando Sentinel, where she covered the Orlando Magic. Beginning in 1999, Slusser worked for the San Francisco Chronicle, covering the Oakland Athletics of MLB. After more than two decades covering the A's, she became the San Francisco Giants beat writer for the Chronicle starting in 2021.

Slusser was elected as the vice-president of the Baseball Writers' Association of America (BBWAA) in October 2011. The next year, she was voted the president of the BBWAA, the first woman to serve in the role. In 2014, she was elected to the BBWAA board.

She has published two books, 100 Things A’s Fans Need to Know and Do Before They Die in 2014, and If These Walls Could Talk, Tales from the Oakland A’s Dugout, Locker Room and Press Box, co-authored with Ken Korach, in 2019.

== Awards ==
The National Sports Media Association named Slusser and fellow Chronicle sports scribe Ann Killion co-California Sportswriters of the Year in 2019. Slusser was the first team beat sportswriter to win the award.

In 2017, she won a Northern California Area Emmy for her work on "SportsTalk Live: Women in Sports Media". She has also won recognition from the San Francisco Press Club, the Peninsula Press Club, and the Association for Women in Sports Media.

== Personal life ==
Slusser married sportswriter Dan Brown in 1999. They had met in 1990, when she was a reporter for the Bee and he was a University of California, Davis student reporter. During their first three years of marriage, she covered the A's for the Chronicle while he was covering the Giants for the San Jose Mercury News. They divorced in 2022.
