= 17-Mile Drive =

Scenic road

Coordinates: 36.584839°N 121.9651°W

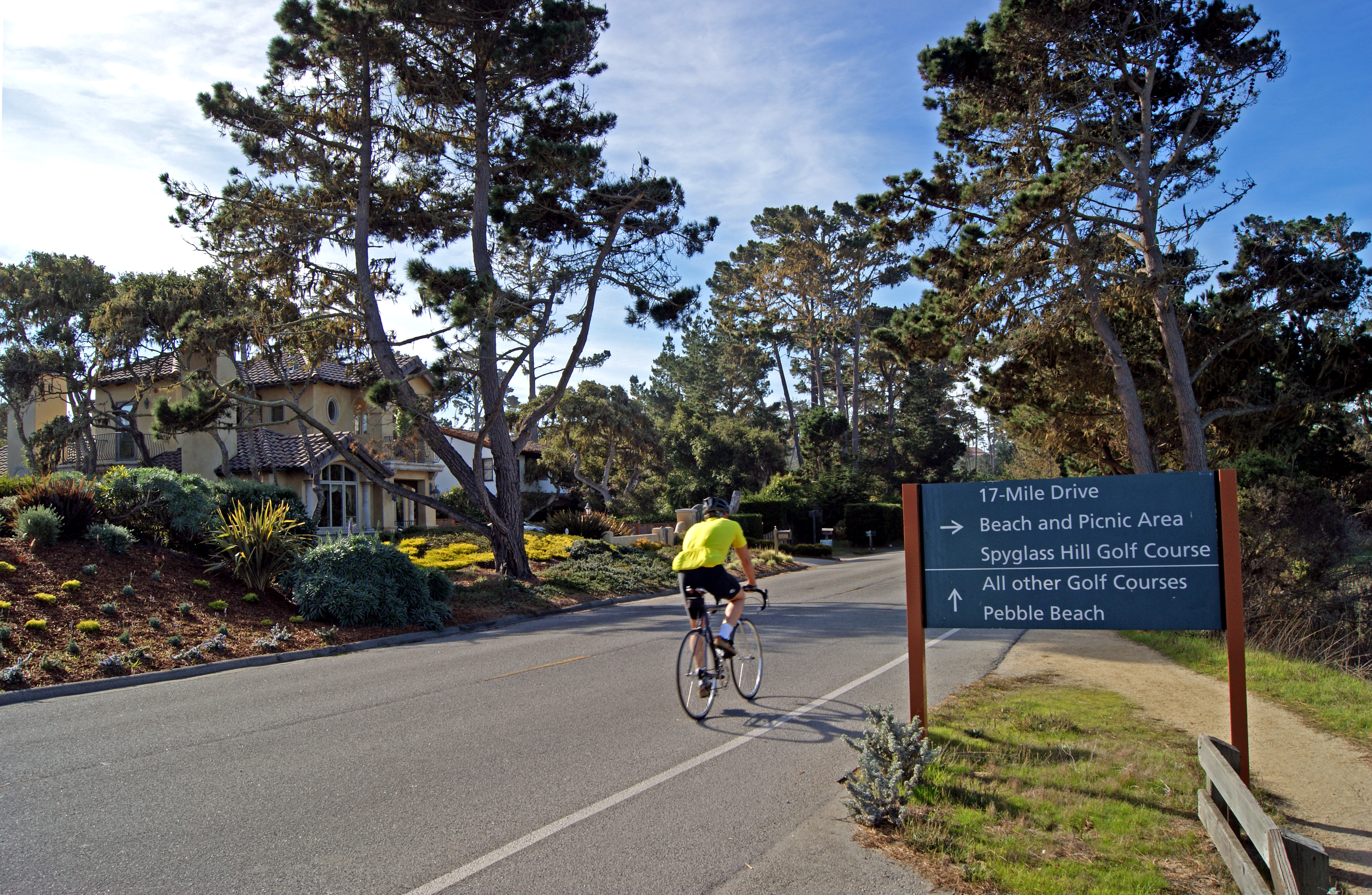
- 17 Mile Drive near Spanish Bay Road
- Interactive map of 17-Mile Drive
- Type: Scenic toll road
- Maintained by: Pebble Beach Company
- Length: 17 mi (27 km)
- From: Del Monte Blvd in Pacific Grove
- Major junctions: SR 68 / Sunset Dr; Carmel Way
- To: SR 68 / SR 1

Construction
- Completed: 1880

Other
- Website: Scenic 17-Mile Drive

17-Mile Drive is a scenic road through Pebble Beach and Pacific Grove on the Monterey Peninsula in California, much of which hugs the Pacific coastline and passes famous golf courses, mansions and scenic attractions, including the Lone Cypress, Bird Rock and the 5,300-acre (2,100 ha) Del Monte Forest of Monterey Cypress trees.

The drive serves as the main road through the gated community of Pebble Beach. Inside this community, nonresidents have to pay a toll to use the road. Like the community, the majority of 17-Mile Drive is owned and operated by the Pebble Beach Corporation. The 17-Mile Drive is a 17-mile (27 km)-long scenic loop having five primary entrances - the main highway entrance at California State Route 1, and entrances in Carmel and Pacific Grove.

== History ==
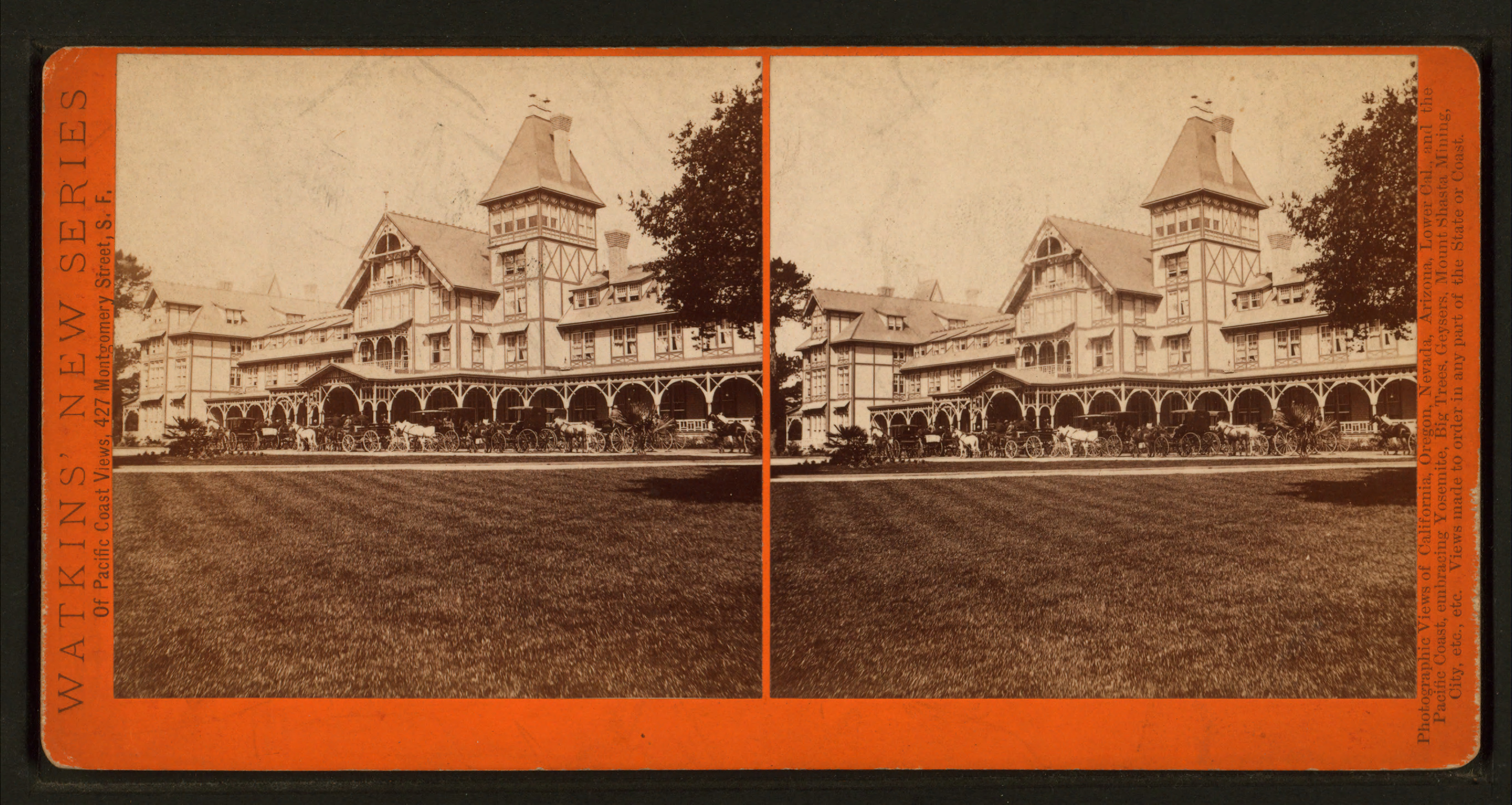
Original Hotel Del Monte, ca. 1885

In 1602 the Monterey Peninsula was mapped by Spanish explorers. By 1840 the area now called Pebble Beach was a rancho left to widow Carmen Garcia Barreto Maderiaga Maria by her husband. She sold the 4,000-acre (1,600 ha) property for $500 in 1846. Ownership passed several times until 1862 when the property was purchased at auction for 12 cents for 1-acre (0.40 ha) by David Jacks. At the time, the area was called "Stillwater Cove". Jacks leased the land to the "China Man Hop Company", a small village with a population of about 30 Chinese fishermen living in shacks built upon the rocky shoreline.

In 1880, Jacks sold the land to the Pacific Improvement Company (PIC), a consortium of The Big Four railroad barons: Charles Crocker, Mark Hopkins, Collis Huntington and Leland Stanford. By 1892, the PIC laid out a scenic road that they called the 17-Mile Drive, meandering along the beaches and among the forested areas between Monterey and Carmel. Within short order, the area became a tourist destination with the building of the Hotel Del Monte.

The hotel was the starting and finishing point for 17-Mile Drive, (originally called the 18-mile Drive by hotel operators). The drive was offered as a pleasure excursion to hotel guests, and was intended to attract wealthy buyers of large and scenic residential plots on PIC land. Sightseers riding horses or carriages along the 17-Mile Drive sometimes stopped at Pebble Beach to pick up agate and other stones polished smooth by the waves, and they commented on a few unusual tree formations known as the Witch Tree and the Ostrich Tree—the latter formed by two trees leaning on each other. At that time, the Chinese fishing community continued in existence despite mounting anti-Chinese sentiment among Monterey residents of European heritage. At roadside stands, Chinese-American girls sold shells and polished pebbles to tourists. In the 1900s, the automobile began replacing horses on 17-Mile Drive, and by 1907 there were only automobiles. The drive featured region's historical sites, forests, and on to the coastal scenic attractions in the Hotel Del Monte Park Reservation, as it was known at the time.

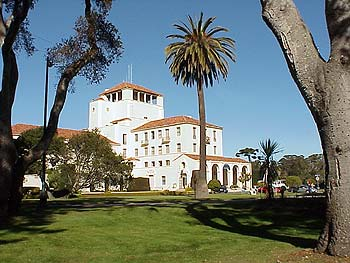
The Hotel Del Monte rebuilt in 1926, now Herrmann Hall

Drawn by six bay horses, President Benjamin Harrison took the coach ride through the reservation in 1891. The coach was adorned with the national colors "and the harness on the horses was lined with bunting and roses as far as possible." In the newspaper The Monterey Cypress, President Harrison noted "This is a lovely spot. I only wish I could stay here a week." In 1887, the hotel was destroyed by fire and replaced with a new structure. The Del Monte Golf Course was added in 1897 as part of the hotel and is today the oldest operating course west of the Mississippi. In 1919, the Los Angeles Times called the 17-Mile Drive one of the "great wonders of the world."

On February 27, 1919, Samuel Finley Brown Morse formed the Del Monte Properties Company, and acquired the extensive holdings of the Pacific Improvement Company, which included the Del Monte Forest and the Hotel Del Monte. Another fire destroyed that structure and was replaced by a third hotel. This new hotel was finished in 1926 and requisitioned by the United States government as a training facility in 1942. After World War II, the Hotel del Monte building and surrounding grounds were acquired by the United States Navy for its Naval Postgraduate School and the building was renamed Herrmann Hall. The Del Monte Forest, including the famed 17-Mile Drive, remained under the ownership of Del Monte Properties Company.

On March 30, 1977, the Del Monte Properties Company was reincorporated as the Pebble Beach Corporation. In May 1979, 20th Century Fox, later bought by Marvin Davis, purchased the Pebble Beach Corporation. When the film company was sold to Rupert Murdoch in 1985, Davis kept several company assets not directly related to the film and TV industry, including the Pebble Beach Company. In 1990 Davis sold the company to Japanese businessman Minoru Isutani, who made it a subsidiary of the Japanese resort company Taiheiyo Club Inc. under a holding company called the Lone Cypress Company. In 1999 the Pebble Beach Company was acquired from Cypress by an investor group led by Clint Eastwood, Arnold Palmer, and Peter Ueberroth.

== Route description ==
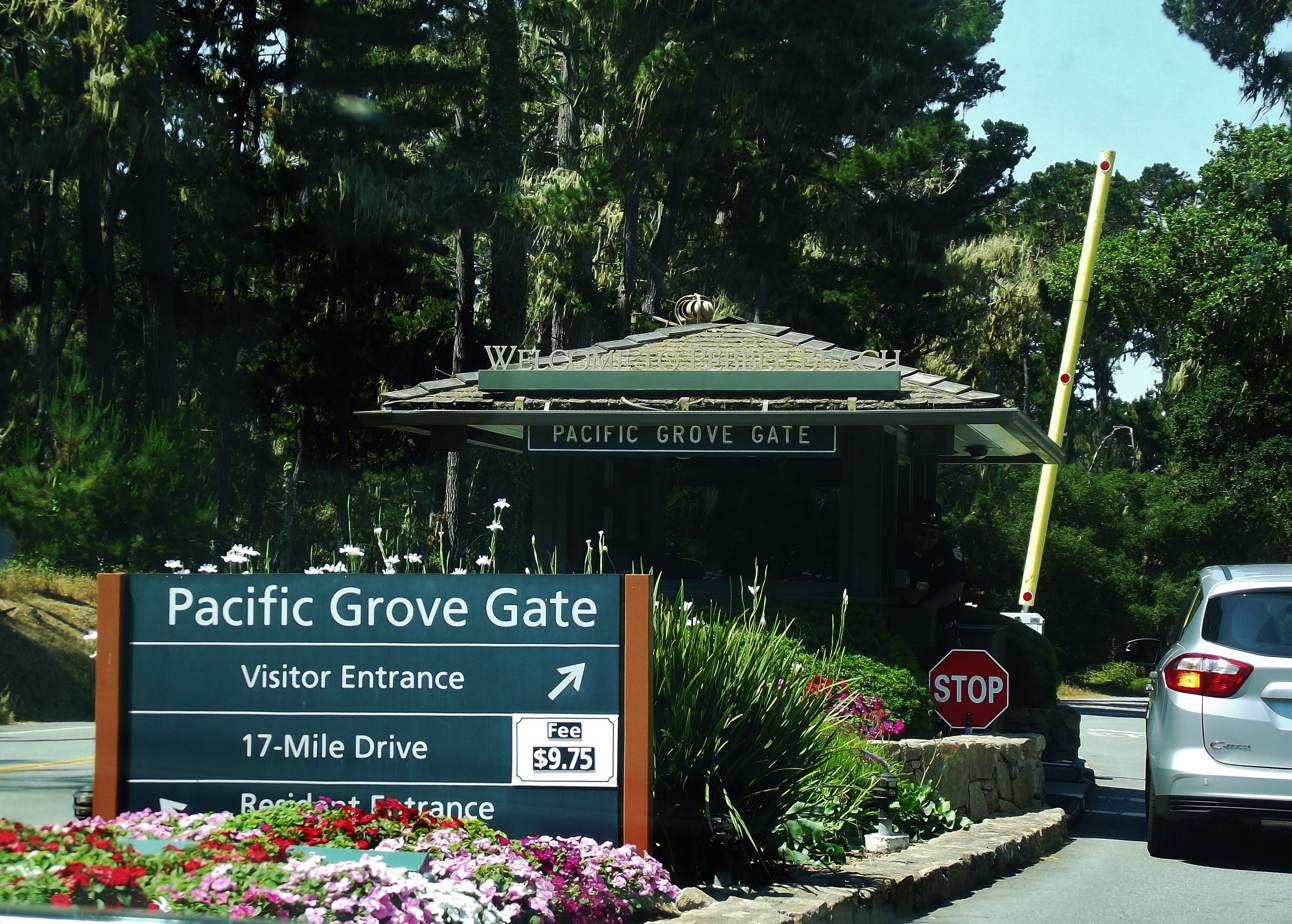
Pacific Grove entrance

17-Mile Drive entrance gates

At the north end, a portion of the early route through Pacific Grove begins at the intersection of Del Monte Blvd and Esplanade Street. The famous portion of 17-Mile Drive then begins a few miles south of this point. The crossing of Highway 68 (Holman Highway/Sunset Drive) and 17-Mile Drive marks the entrance to Pebble Beach.

From the Sunset Drive/Pacific Grove gate, the drive runs inland past Spanish Bay, then adjacent to beaches and up into the coastal hills, providing scenic viewpoints. The route allows for self-directed travel and stopping, with frequent turnouts along the roadway in many locations along the route. Without stops, it takes a minimum of 20 minutes to reach Carmel. The numerous turnouts allow stopping to take pictures, or getting out to stroll along the ocean or among the trees. Visitors receive a map that points out some of the more scenic spots. In addition, a red-dashed line is marked in the center of the main road to guide visitors, and help prevent them from venturing into the adjacent neighborhood streets.

== Scenic attractions ==
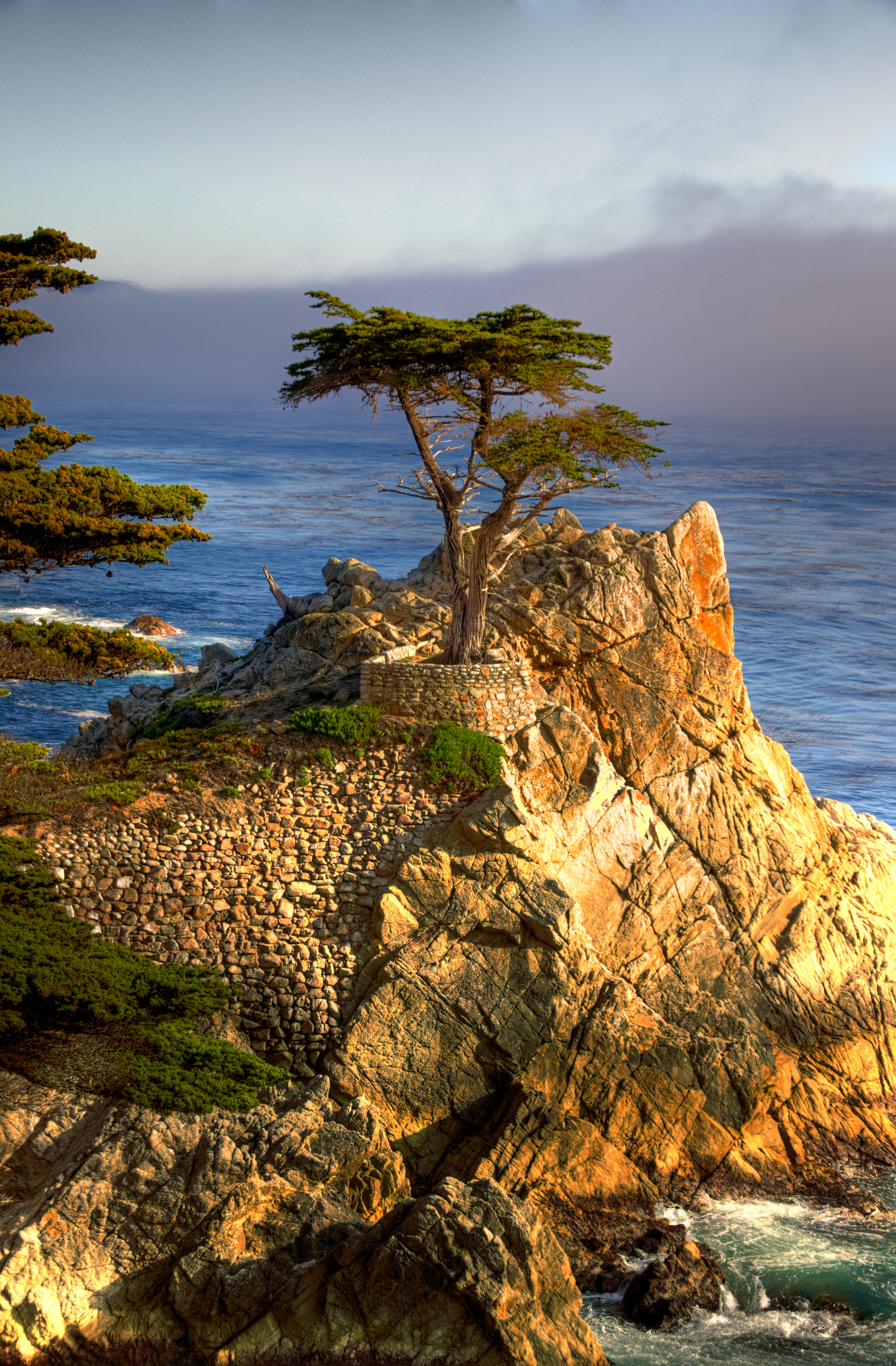
The Lone Cypress prior to the Pineapple Express of 2019

Primary scenic attractions include Cypress Point, Bird Rock, Point Joe, Pescadero Point, Fanshell Beach & Seal Rock. The famous "Witch Tree" landmark, often used as scenic background in movies and television, was formerly at Pescadero Point. The tree was blown down by a storm on January 14, 1964. Pescadero Point is also the site of the Ghost Tree, a landmark Monterey Cypress tree. The tree gives its name to a dangerous extreme surfing location known to have storm waves. Currently, the surf break of Ghost Tree is off limits to surfers and watercraft.

Chief among the scenic attractions is the Lone Cypress, a salt-pruned Monterey cypress (macrocarpa) tree which is the official symbol of Pebble Beach and a frequent fixture of television broadcasts from this area. In 1990 the Monterey Journal reported that Pebble Beach's lawyer, Kerry C. Smith, said "The image of the tree has been trademarked by us," and that it intended to control any display of the cypress for commercial purposes. The company had warned photographers that "they cannot even use existing pictures of the tree for commercial purposes".

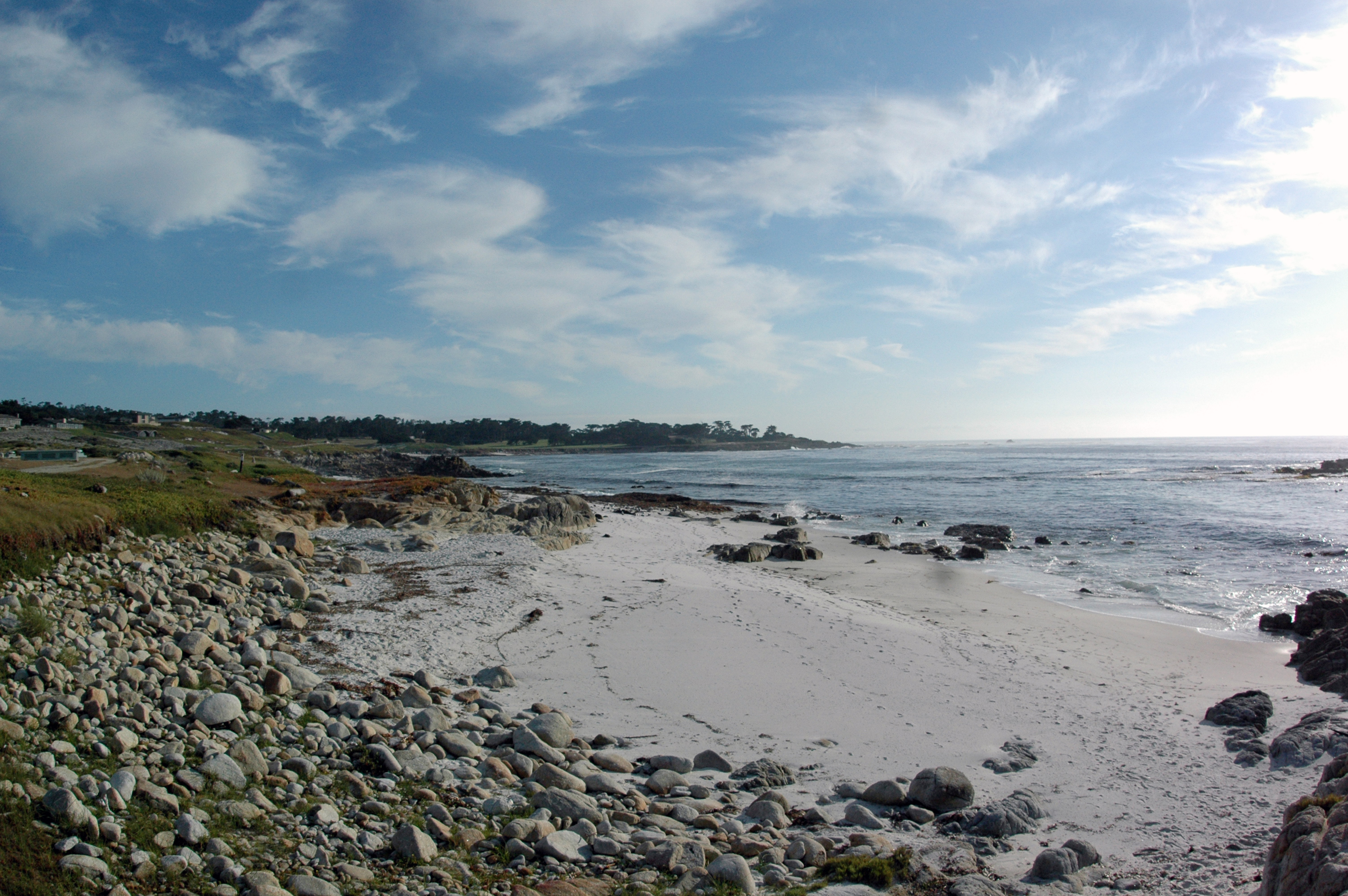
Beach near the Pacific Grove entrance of the 17-Mile Drive

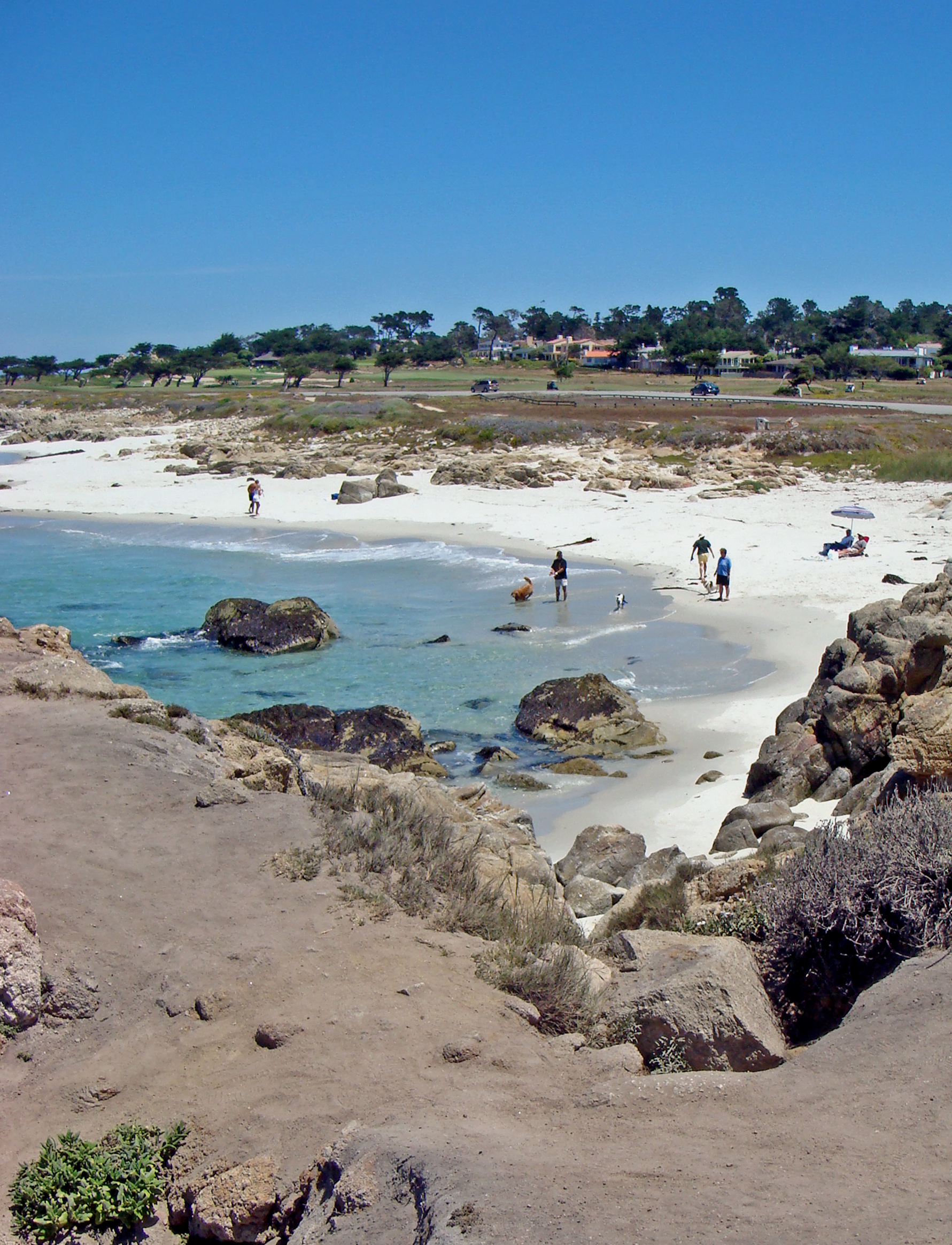
Beach access near golf links at Pebble Beach

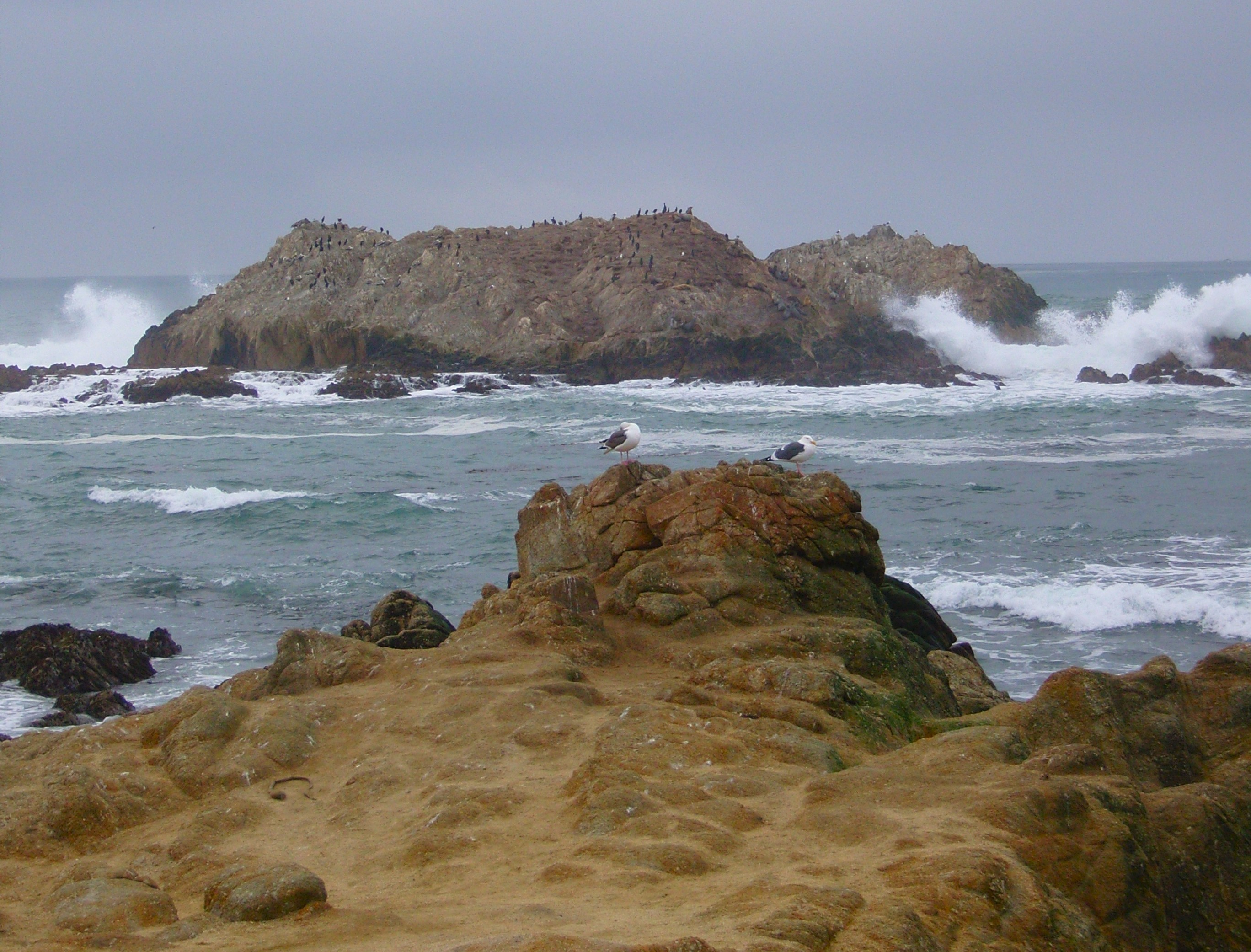
Bird Rock

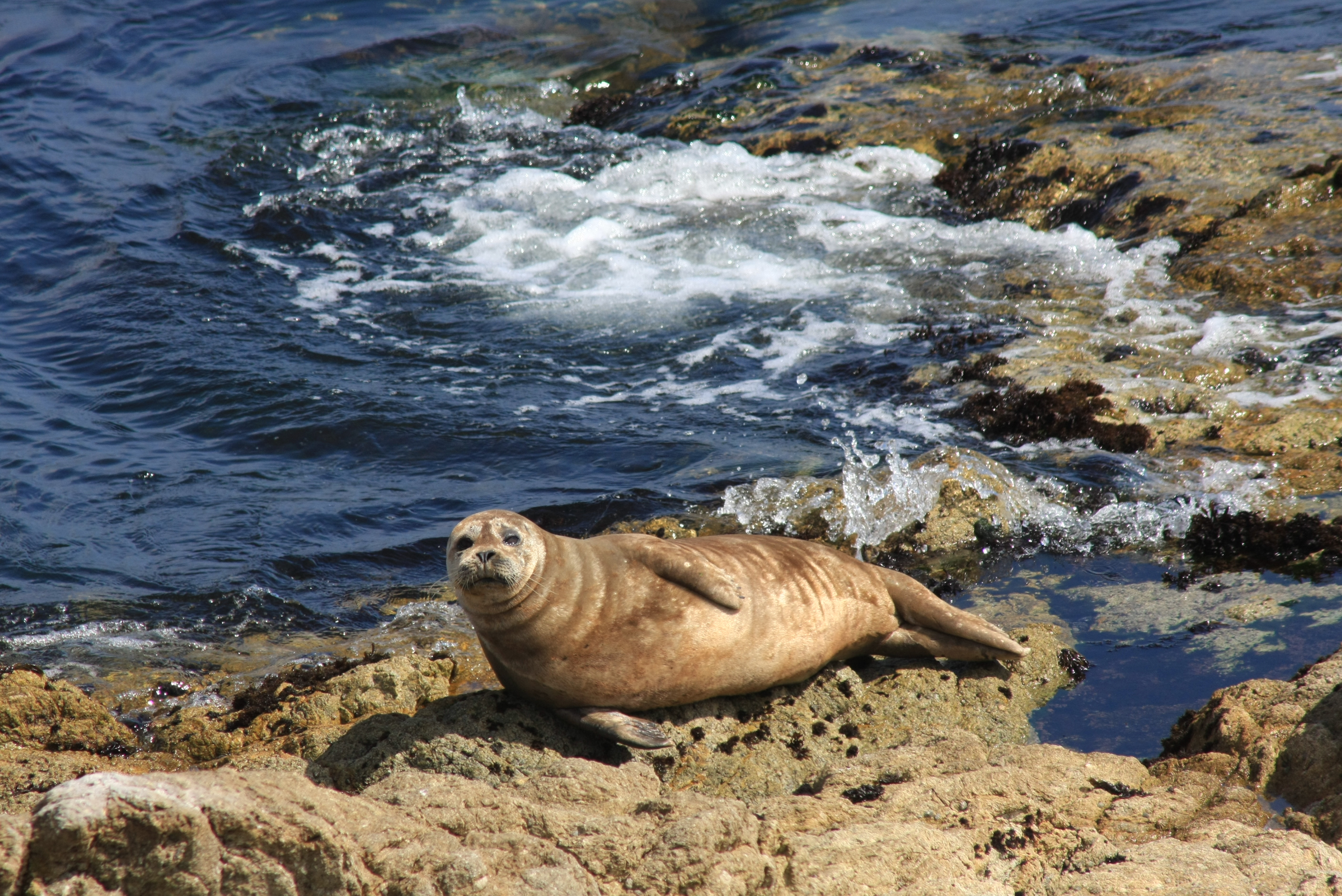
Seal seen along 17-Mile Drive
