= Lone Cypress =

Monterey cypress tree in Pebble Beach, California, United States

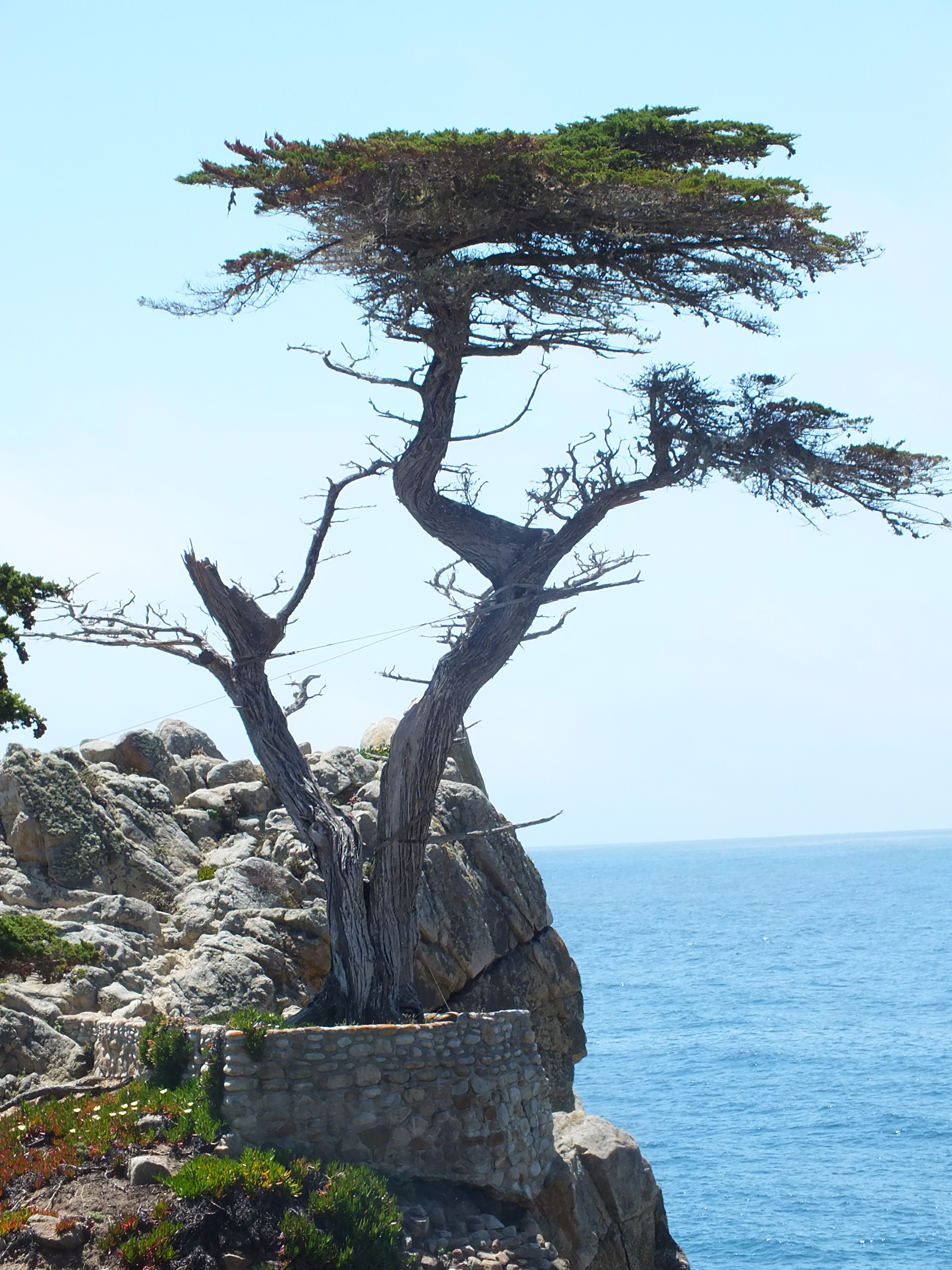
- The Lone Cypress in 2024
- Interactive map of Lone Cypress
- Species: Cupressus macrocarpa (Monterey cypress)
- Location: Pebble Beach, California
- Coordinates: 36°34′07″N 121°57′55″W
- Date seeded: c.1750
- Custodian: Pebble Beach Company

The Lone Cypress is a Monterey cypress tree located in Pebble Beach, California. Standing atop a granite headland overlooking Carmel Bay, the tree has become a Western icon and has been called one of the most photographed trees in North America.

== History ==
=== Early history ===
The tree is believed to have been seeded circa 1750 in what was then the Spanish colony of New Spain. However, due to the invasive nature of traditional dendrochronology, the precise age of the tree is unknown and can only be inferred.

Over the centuries the tree has been weathered by the wind and salt spray coming off the Pacific Ocean, gradually altering its appearance. The earliest known depictions of the tree's likeness in paintings and photographs date to the 1880s, which shows the tree with a lush dome-shaped canopy.

=== 20th century ===
In 1941, a stone retaining wall was constructed around the base of the tree to protect its roots from erosion.

In 1948, a series of cables were installed to help support the tree.

In 1969, the tree was fenced off to the public in order to protect its roots from being damaged from trampling.

In 1984, an unknown arsonist attempted to set fire to the tree. The tree survived with only minor fire scarring.

=== 21st century ===
On February 16, 2019, the tree lost one of its limbs during a severe weather event known as a Pineapple Express. This dramatically altered its appearance.

=== Future ===
The future longevity of the tree is unknown. The longest-lived Monterey cypress based on physical evidence lived to only 284 years old.

== Geography ==
The tree is located off 17-Mile Drive between Cypress Point Club and the Pebble Beach Golf Links, two of world's best-known golf courses.

The Monterey cypress grows naturally only in Pebble Beach and Point Lobos.

== Trademark ==
A drawing of the tree was registered as Pebble Beach Company's trademark in 1919. The company said the trademark protected not only the logo but also the tree itself.

== Gallery ==
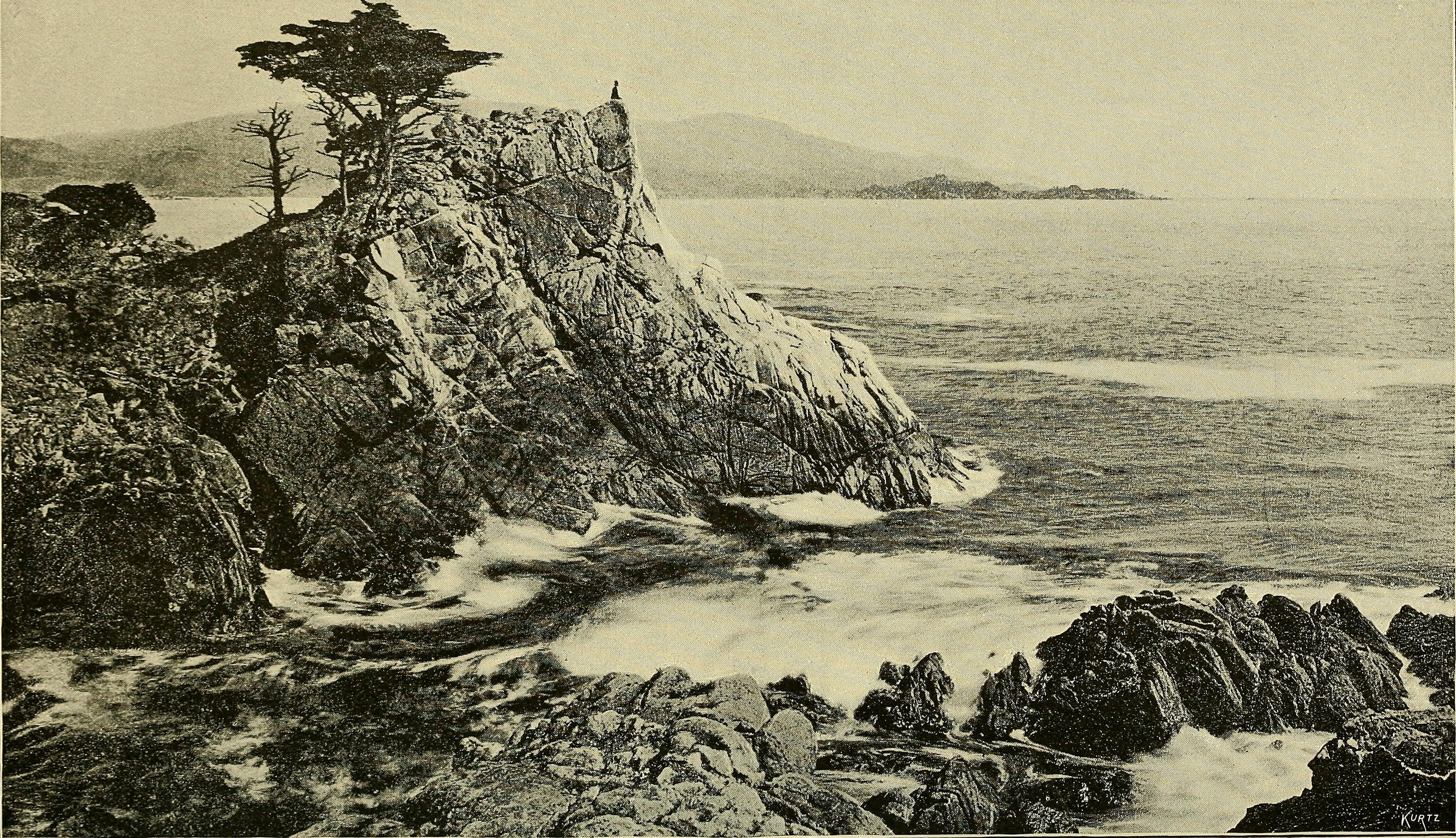
Cypress Point from Wintering In California by Charles Howard Shinn, 1885

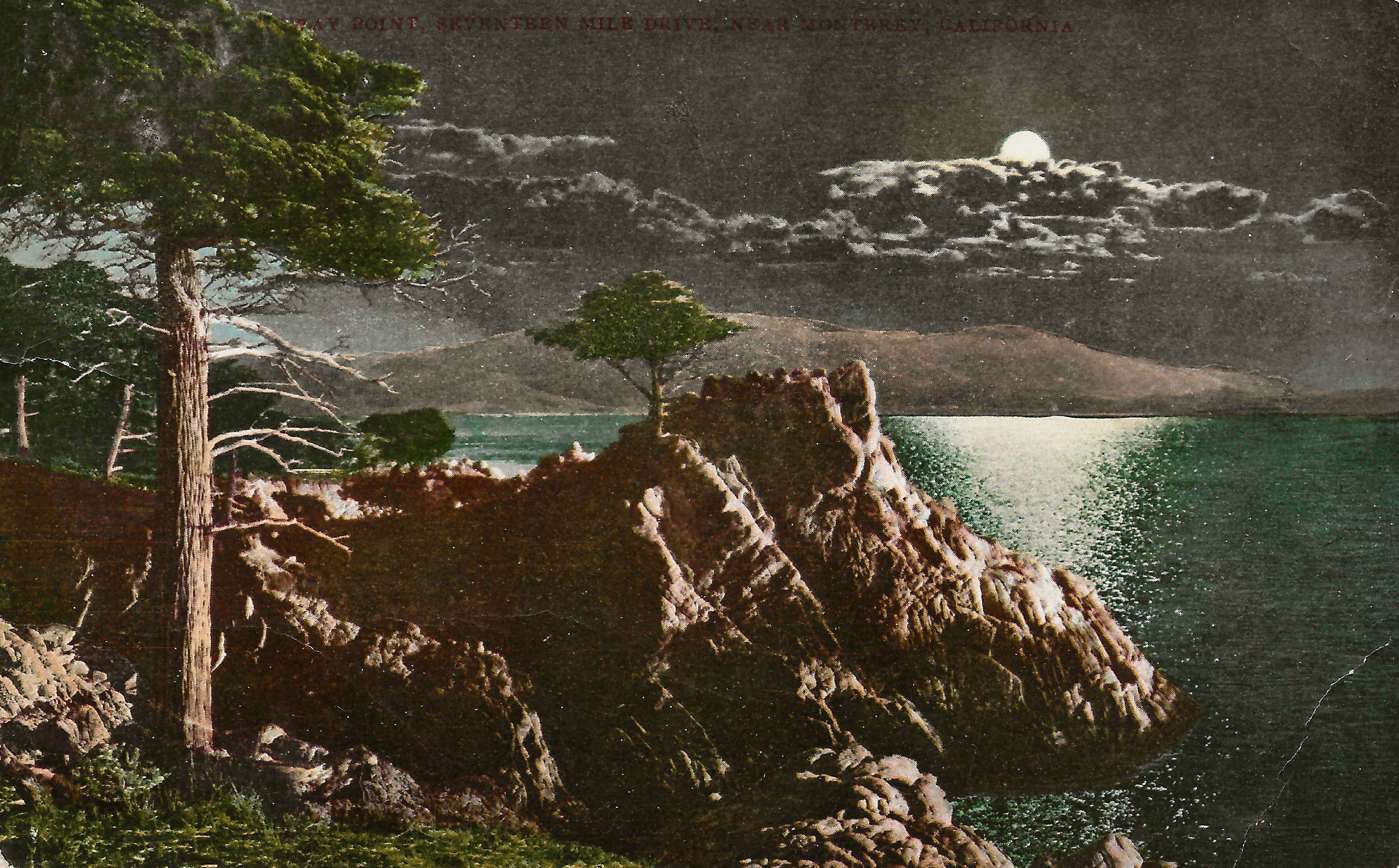
Postcard of Lone Cypress at Midway Point, 17 Mile Drive, by Edward H. Mitchell, 1910

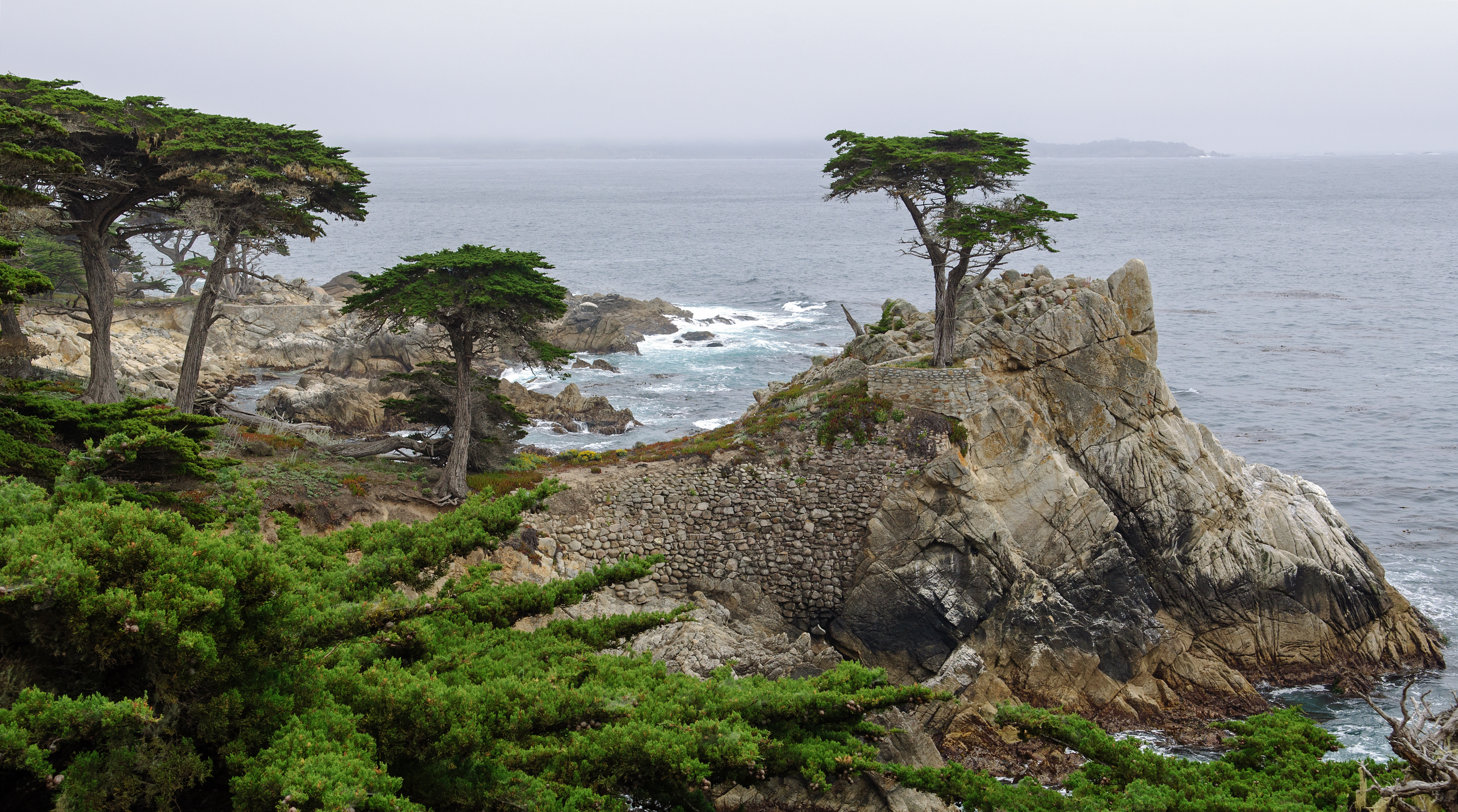
Lone Cypress, 2017

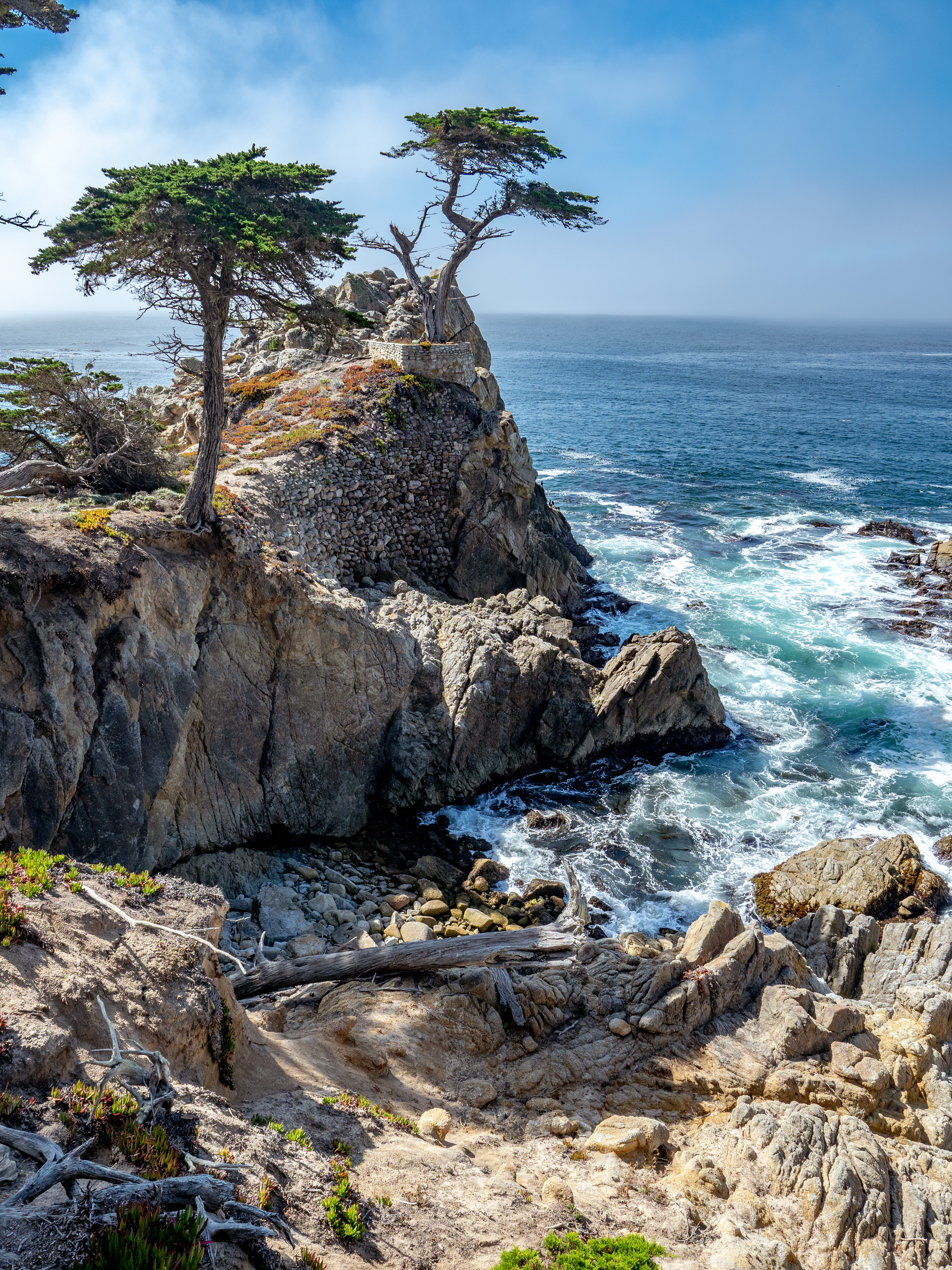
Lone Cypress showing its altered appearance, 2019

== See also ==
- List of individual trees
