= Cypress forest =

A Cypress forest is a western United States plant association typically dominated by one or more cypress species. Example species comprising the canopy include Cupressus macrocarpa. In some cases these forests have been severely damaged by goats, cattle and other grazing animals. While cypress species are clearly dominant within a Cypress forest, other trees such as California Buckeye, Aesculus californica, are found in some Cypress forests.

== Examples ==
The Guadalupe Island Cypress Forest is situated on Guadalupe Island, offshore from Baja California. This forest of Hesperocyparis guadalupensis trees was devastated by introduced goats, but conservation biology efforts have been conducted to assist in restoring the forest.

Another example on the Pacific Coast mainland of Northern California is the Sargent's cypress Forest, located in coastal Marin County, California.

== See also ==
- Pygmy forest
