= KSPB =

Radio station in Pebble Beach, California

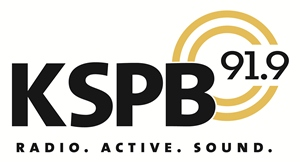
- Pebble Beach, California; United States
- Broadcast area: Monterey County, California
- Frequency: 91.9 MHz
- Branding: Radioactive Sound

Programming
- Format: Variety
- Affiliations: BBC World Service, Commonwealth Club of California, Climate One

Ownership
- Owner: Stevenson School

History
- Call sign meaning: Stevenson-Pebble Beach

Technical information
- Licensing authority: FCC
- Facility ID: 57047
- Class: A
- ERP: 1,000 watts
- HAAT: 148.0 meters (485.6 ft)
- Transmitter coordinates: 36°35′11″N 121°55′21″W

Links
- Public license information: Public file; LMS
- Webcast: Listen live
- Website: kspb.org

KSPB (91.9 FM) is a radio station broadcasting a Variety format. Licensed to Pebble Beach, California, United States, the station serves the Monterey Peninsula, Salinas, and Santa Cruz areas. The station is currently owned by Stevenson School (formerly known as Robert Louis Stevenson School) and features programming from Public Radio International. Operating for more than fifty years, in some form since 1966, the station plays primarily student-selected music historically known as alternative, modern, or college rock. Outside of student programming hours, the station broadcasts BBC World Service news programming plus Climate One from the Commonwealth Club of California broadcasts on weekend mornings. KSPB has listeners in five counties in California - Monterey, Santa Cruz, San Benito, Santa Clara, and San Mateo - with a potential total listenership of more than 1 million. With a fan base spanning from Monterey to Santa Cruz, KSPB is one of the largest high school radio stations in the United States. Every year, KSPB also presents live broadcasts of various local sporting events.

== Music and programming ==
At the core of KSPB is its student-run programming, which airs every day. Because each student disc jockey chooses the genre of music for their specific show, music programming is as diverse as the DJs, but tends to stay hip and contemporary. When student programming is not available, the station rotates broadcasting from the BBC World Service and Climate One at the Commonwealth Club of California.

== Student management and academic component ==
The station is student-run and includes staff positions, from web master to program director. Before applying for a live show on air, each student is required to take a class to learn about Federal Communications Commission (FCC) regulations, and how to operate the station independently.

== Awards ==
KSPB, its faculty, and student disc jockeys have received several awards throughout the station's history. Most recently, the station was recognized by the Monterey County Weekly in its "Best of 2011 - Editor's Picks" in the category of "Best Evidence That The Kids Are Alright."
