= Pebble Beach Authors & Ideas Festival =

Literary festival in California

Pebble Beach Authors & Ideas Festival, formerly Carmel Authors and Ideas Festival, takes place on the last weekend of September in Pebble Beach, California.

== History ==
Held annually since 2007, founders Cynthia and James McGillen were inspired to create the event after attending the Sun Valley Writers' Conference in Idaho for many years.

Until 2013 it was held at the Sunset Center in Carmel-by-the-Sea, when it was moved to Pebble Beach by its co-founder, James McGillen, owing to problems with renegotiating a contract at the venue. It relocated to Stevenson School in Pebble Beach and Santa Catalina School in Monterey.

== Description ==
The festival attracts many of the world's top authors and thinkers, including authors of New York Times best-sellers and winners of the Pulitzer and Nobel Prize. The event is organised by the Carmel Ideas Foundation.

The 16th festival is scheduled to take place from September 22 to 24, 2023.

== Past speakers ==
Some of the speakers who have presented at the festival include:

- Reza Aslan
- Douglas Brinkley
- Niall Ferguson
- Frank Gehry
- Elizabeth Gilbert
- Jane Goodall
- Carl Hiaasen
- Khaled Hosseini
- Helen Mirren
- Sandra Day O'Connor
- P. J. O'Rourke
- Michael Pollan
- Condoleezza Rice
- Jeremi Suri
- Abraham Verghese
