= Stevenson School =

School in Pebble Beach, California, US

Stevenson School (RLS)
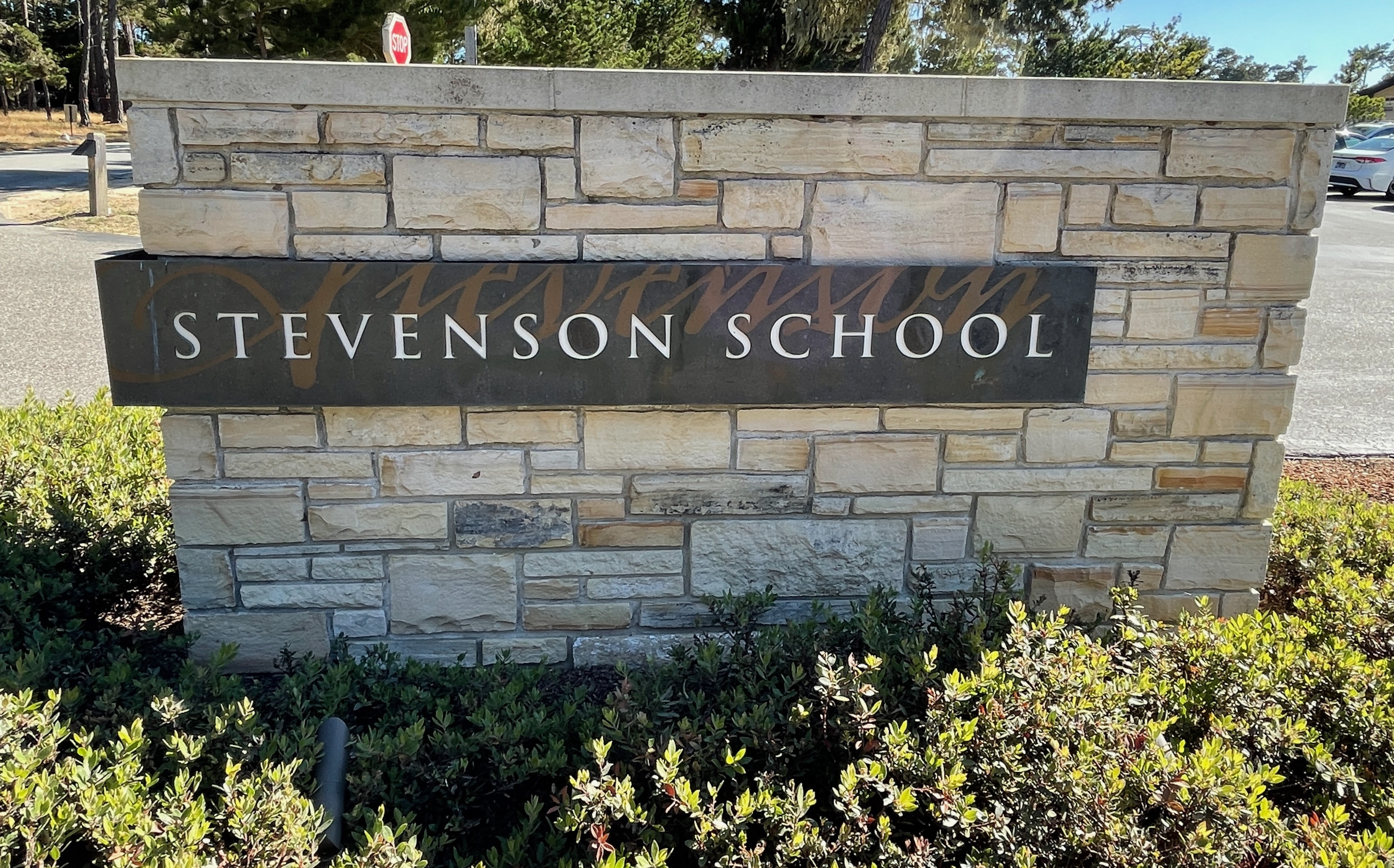
- Stevenson School Sign

Location
- 3152 Forest Lake Rd. Pebble Beach, California; United States
- Coordinates: 36°34′58″N 121°57′6″W

Information
- Type: Boarding school
- Motto: Suaviter in Modo Fortiter in Re (Gentle in manner, resolute in deed)
- Established: 1952; 74 years ago
- Founder: Robert U. Ricklefs
- President: Dan Griffiths
- Teaching staff: 9–12: 59.1 (FTE); PK–8: 38.8 (FTE)
- Grades: Pre-K–12
- Gender: Co-ed
- Enrollment: 9–12: 498 (2017–18); PK–8: 236 (2017–18)
- Student to teacher ratio: 9–12: 8.4; PK–8: 6.1
- Colour: Forest green
- Nickname: Pirates
- Affiliations: National Association of Independent Schools; The Association of Boarding Schools
- Website: stevensonschool.org

Stevenson School (also known as Robert Louis Stevenson School and abbreviated as RLS) is a coeducational, private school for boarding and day students in preschool through 12th grade. Its high school campus is in Pebble Beach, California, while its PK-8 campus is in an unincorporated area of neighboring Carmel.

== History ==
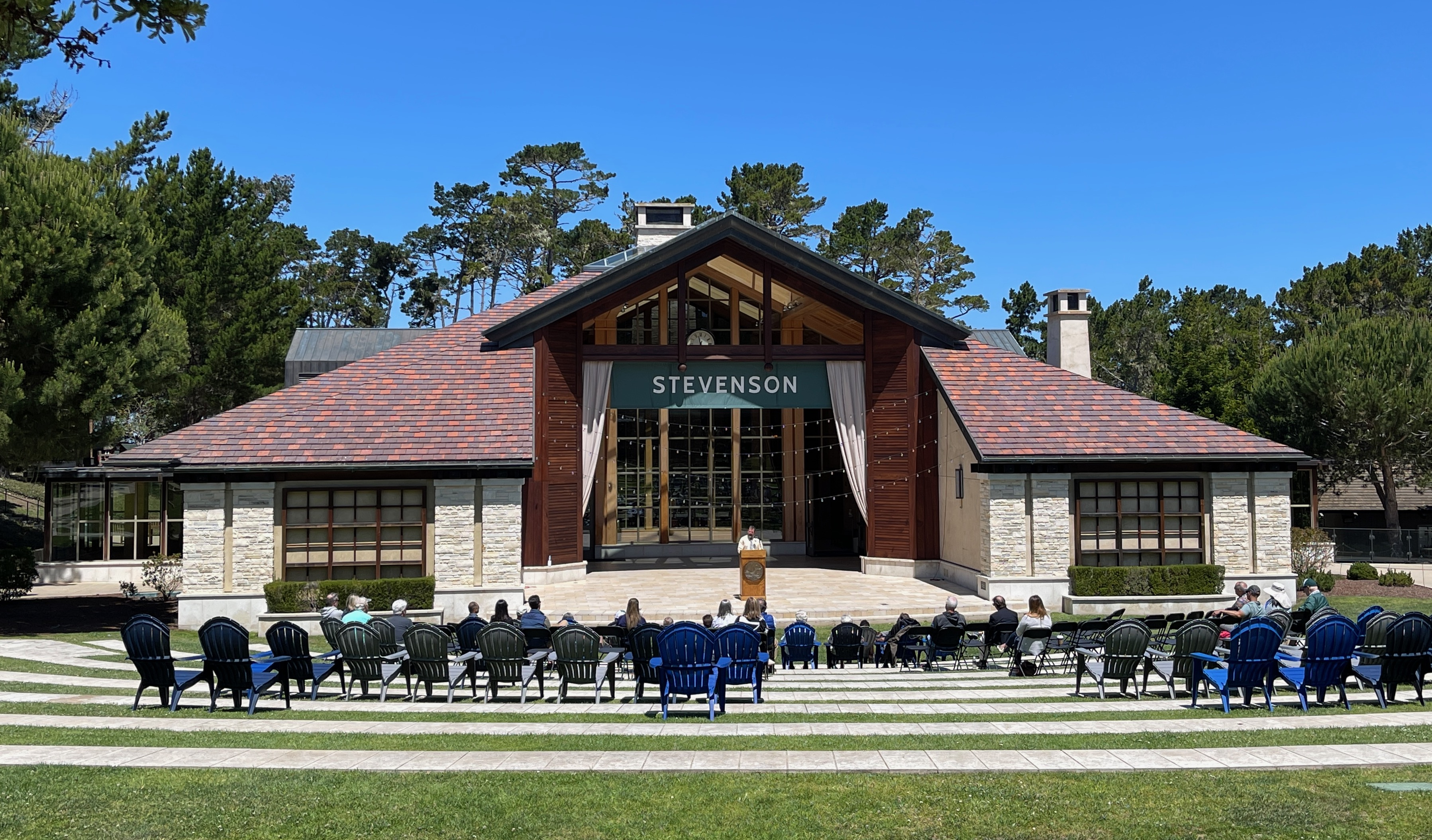
Rosen Family Student Center

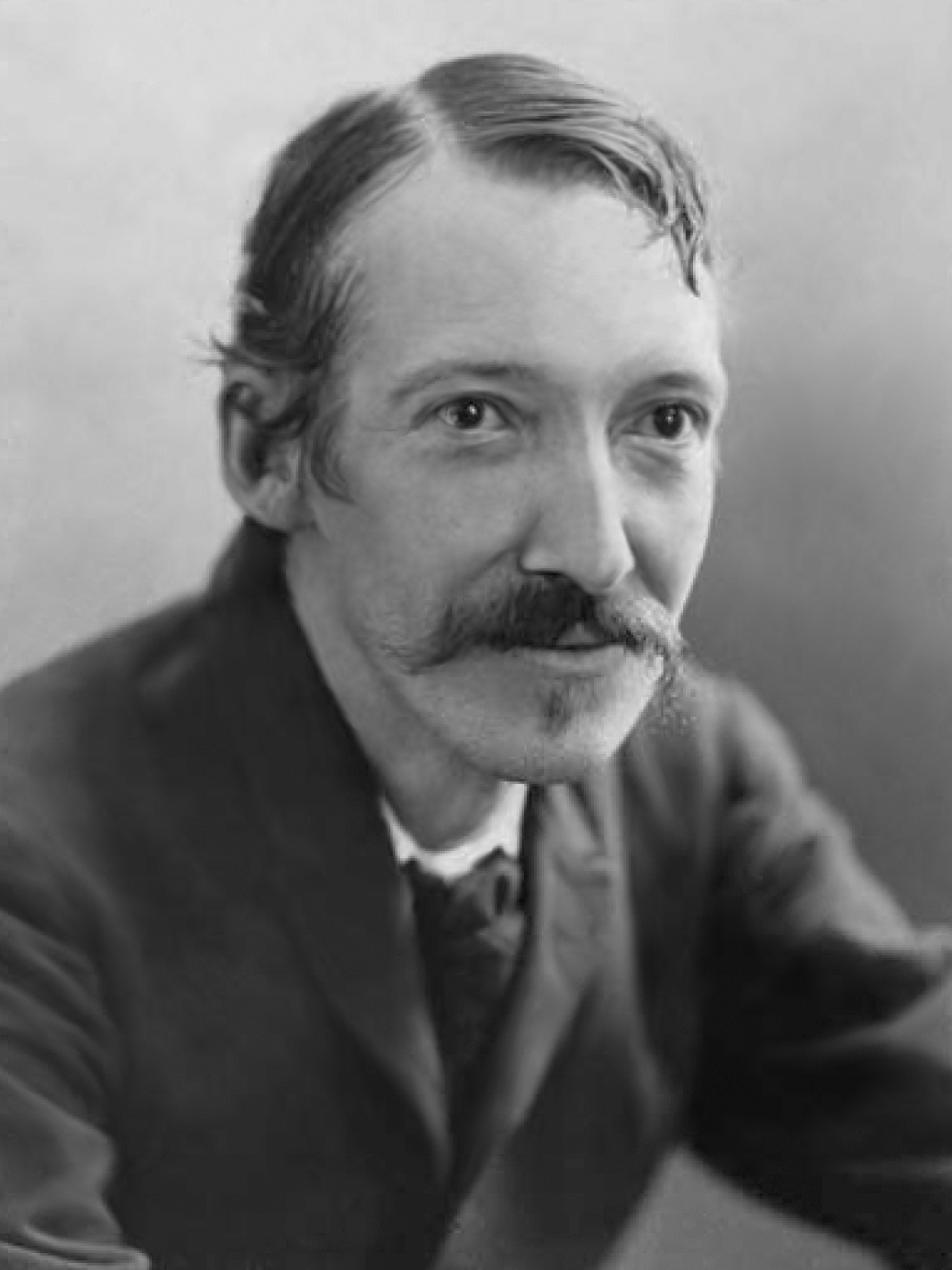
Robert Louis Stevenson by Henry Walter Barnett

In 1925, Grace Parsons Douglas (1880–1968) founded the Douglas Camp School for Girls in Pebble Beach after purchasing the land on the Monterey Peninsula from Samuel Finley Brown Morse. After operating the school for a quarter century, the school was sold in May 1952 to Robert and Marian Ricklefs and became the Del Monte School for Boys, then the Robert Louis Stevenson, which they named in honor of Robert Louis Stevenson, the well-known Scottish author who reportedly found inspiration for his tales of high adventure during his 1870s sojourn in the Monterey area. Many of the school buildings, the school newspaper, sports teams, and other features of the school are named for places or themes from Robert Louis Stevenson's life or writings.

In the early years, Stevenson was a boys' school offering education in grades 7–12, though grades 7–8 were discontinued when the high school expanded.

The Pebble Beach Campus has had an Episcopal chaplain from the early days, though the school has always been open to students of all faiths. The school considers itself to be non-sectarian and explicit religious instruction is not included in the curriculum. In 1987, the Church in the Forest was established in Erdman Memorial Chapel on the Pebble Beach campus, initially with both Episcopalian and Methodist chaplains. The chapel is used by some local residents, and is where boarding students attend vespers.

Robert Ricklefs (May 23, 1909 – 20 May 1985) served as headmaster until he retired in 1970; he was succeeded by Gordon Davis, during whose term (1970–1982) the school opened its doors to girls as day students (1976).

Joe Wandke arrived in 1983 from the Tampa Preparatory School in Florida, and during his administration the school has undergone a thorough renovation of the physical plant. In 1988 girls were first admitted as boarding students with the opening of the Silverado dormitory.

Also in 1988, the school was approached by the board of Briarcliff Academy, a private elementary school in the unincorporated area of Carmel Woods, north of Carmel, regarding a merger of the two schools. Stevenson then became a two-campus school comprising grades kindergarten through 12. The Carmel Campus (grades K through 8, adding Pre-K in September 2011) is located in Carmel, while the Pebble Beach Campus (grades 9–12) occupies the original school's location in Pebble Beach.

The school was the setting for Sofia Coppola's 1998 short film Lick the Star.

In 2003 the Rosen Family Student Center was opened. Located in the middle of the Pebble Beach campus, the building features a college center, photography lab, tech center, activities center, wilderness center, multiple classrooms, and the new location of KSPB 91.9. The building is decorated with plush rugs and also features an amphitheater stage, which hosts school assemblies and concerts.

In 2016 Stevenson's food service transitioned from Aqua Terra to Flik. Flik would set up tents in various places in the Carmel Campus and would have trucks come from the Pebble Beach Campus where the food was cooked. Eventually Flik would receive their own dedicated building to serve food in 2018.

In 2011 the Carmel Campus received a new turf field with the center featuring an "S" replacing the old grass field. In 2014 the assembly building located in the northeastern area of the campus was renovated and split up into 3 rooms. This was done to improve STEM learning by giving students spaces specifically designed for the sciences. In 2016 a new amphitheater was constructed between the lawn and blacktop resembling Wandke amphitheater at the Pebble Beach campus. Minor changes were made to the blacktop layout as well. In 2018 a new building located in the northern area of the campus began construction for Flik Dining Services to prepare and serve lunch. In 2020 renovations were made to the main playground adding a seesaw, 2 swings, a tire swing, and two climbing structures. This replaced the previous playground which consisted of 4 swings, monkey bars, a wooden house, and a central structure with slides and bridges. Similar changes were made with the Kindergarten playground. The Pre-K playground remains the same. In 2022 the blacktop received a change in layout, a new ramp, and an improved passageway to the field.

In 2018 the Pebble Beach Campus constructed a new field next to the older baseball and football field. In 2024 the science building is planned to be replaced with a new and improved science building. This is predicted to be complete in 2026.

In 2015, it was announced that Stevenson graduate Kevin Hicks would succeed Wandke as president.

In September 2022, President Hicks was placed on temporary administrative leave from Stevenson School pending an independent inquiry into certain employee concerns that were voiced to the board. In December 2022, it was announced that Hicks' employment had been terminated for undisclosed reasons, with then-Acting President Dan Griffiths accepting an offer to become the school's next president.

== Extracurricular activities ==
Athletics

Stevenson fields varsity teams in tennis, golf, baseball, basketball, American football, lacrosse, field hockey, swimming, water polo, and sailing, among others. In 2018, Stevenson installed a new AstroTurf field for soccer and lacrosse. Historically, Stevenson has fielded strong teams in tennis, golf, lacrosse, and soccer. Stevenson's athletic director Justin Clymo was awarded the Golden Whistle Award in February 2019.

Stevenson also hosts the Stevenson Lacrosse Camp each year in July.

Clubs and activities

The school is home to KSPB 91.9 FM. Other clubs include international debate societies such as Model UN, music and athletic fan clubs, Amnesty International, community service groups such as the Red Cross Club, and a competitive robotics team.

Arts

Stevenson offers courses in both the fine and performing arts including levels of drama, choir, radio and media, drawing and painting, filmmaking and ceramics. Each year the school puts on two plays and one musical in Keck Auditorium located on the Pebble Beach campus.

== Notable alumni ==
- Christian Cévaër, golfer
- Bobby Clampett, golfer, commentator
- Paul Dini, TV show creator, producer, and director
- Alison Eastwood, film director and actress
- Francesca Eastwood, musician and film composer
- Andrew Firestone, businessman and reality TV subject
- Mina Harigae, golfer
- Adam Kokesh, libertarian political activist
- MC Lars, musician
- Rachel Luba, sports agent
- Marie Mutsuki Mockett, writer
- Heather Pease, Olympic gold medalist in synchronized swimming
- Kristoffer Polaha, actor and director
- Susan Slusser, baseball writer
- Alexander Wang, fashion designer
