= Isocupressic acid =

Names
- IUPAC name (13E)-15-Hydroxylabda-8(20),13-dien-19-oic acid
- Systematic IUPAC name (1S,4aR,5S,8aR)-5-[(3E)-5-Hydroxy-3-methylpent-3-en-1-yl]-1,4a-dimethyl-6-methylidenedecahydronaphthalene-1-carboxylic acid

Identifiers
CAS Number	1909-91-7
3D model (JSmol)	Interactive image
ChEMBL	ChEMBL511193
ChemSpider	4942630
PubChem CID	6438138
UNII	6DV5EL78HE
CompTox Dashboard (EPA)	DTXSID901045341
- InChI: InChI=1S/C20H32O3/c1-14(10-13-21)6-8-16-15(2)7-9-17-19(16,3)11-5-12-20(17,4)18(22)23/h10,16-17,21H,2,5-9,11-13H2,1,3-4H3,(H,22,23)/b14-10+/t16-,17+,19+,20-/m0/s1 Key: DOYKMKZYLAAOGH-DOEMEAPXSA-N; InChI=1/C20H32O3/c1-14(10-13-21)6-8-16-15(2)7-9-17-19(16,3)11-5-12-20(17,4)18(22)23/h10,16-17,21H,2,5-9,11-13H2,1,3-4H3,(H,22,23)/b14-10+/t16-,17+,19+,20-/m0/s1 Key: DOYKMKZYLAAOGH-DOEMEAPXBD
- SMILES: O=C(O)[C@]1(CCC[C@@]2([C@H](/C(=C)CC[C@@H]12)CCC(=C/CO)/C)C)C

Properties
Chemical formula	C_{20}H_{32}O_{3}
Molar mass	320.473 g·mol^{−1}
- Except where otherwise noted, data are given for materials in their standard state (at 25 °C [77 °F], 100 kPa). Infobox references

Isocupressic acid is a diterpene acid present in a variety of conifer needles. It induces abortion in cattle. It is found in all parts of the ponderosa pine (Pinus ponderosa), especially the needles. This gives its toxic and abortifacient effects. It is also present in the lodgepole pine (P. contorta), the jeffrey pine (P. jeffreyi) and possibly in the Monterey pine (P. radiata).
