= Pebble Beach, California =

Unincorporated community in California, United States

Pebble Beach
- Unincorporated place
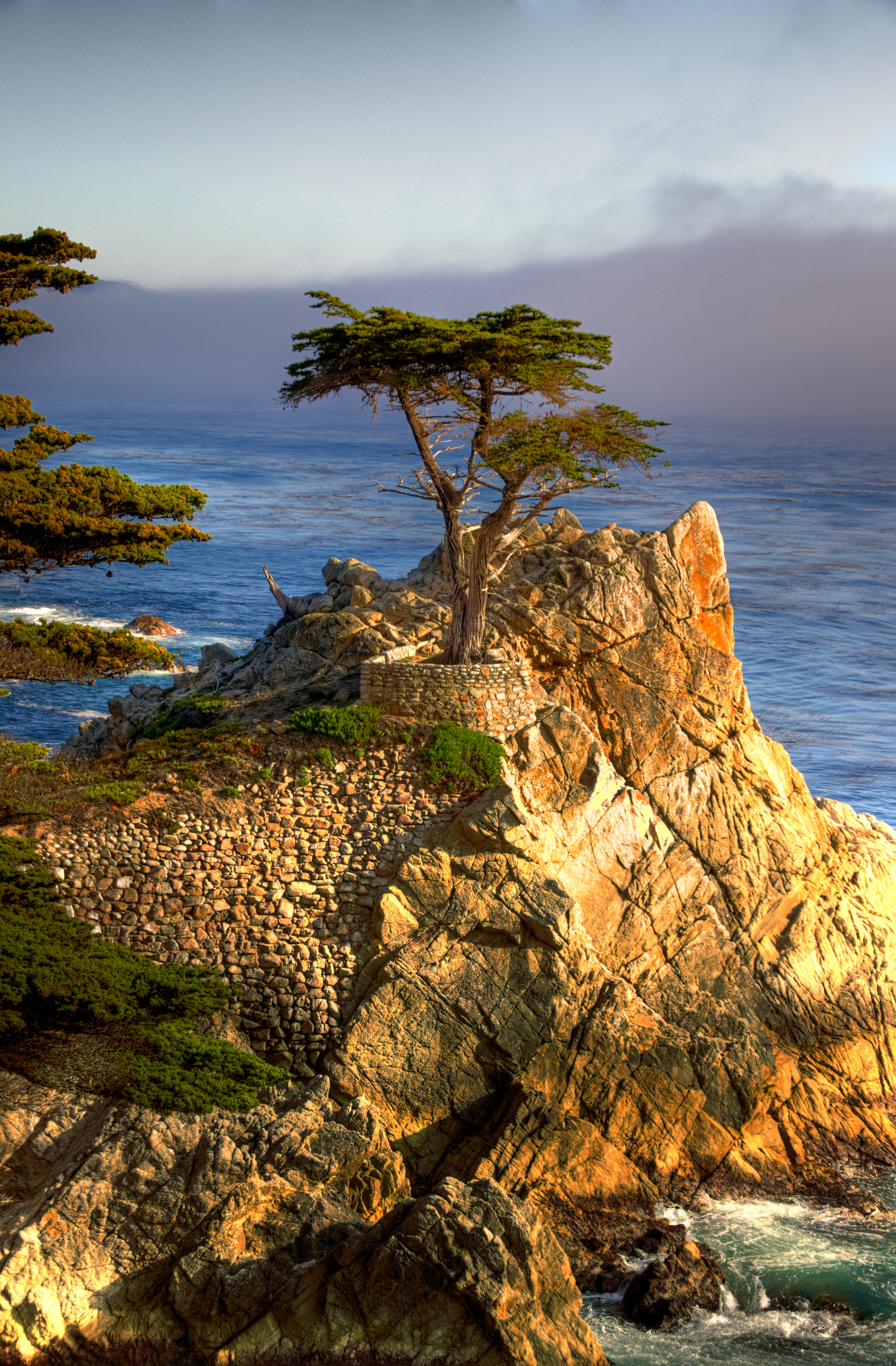
- The Lone Cypress, an icon of the region, as seen from 17-Mile Drive

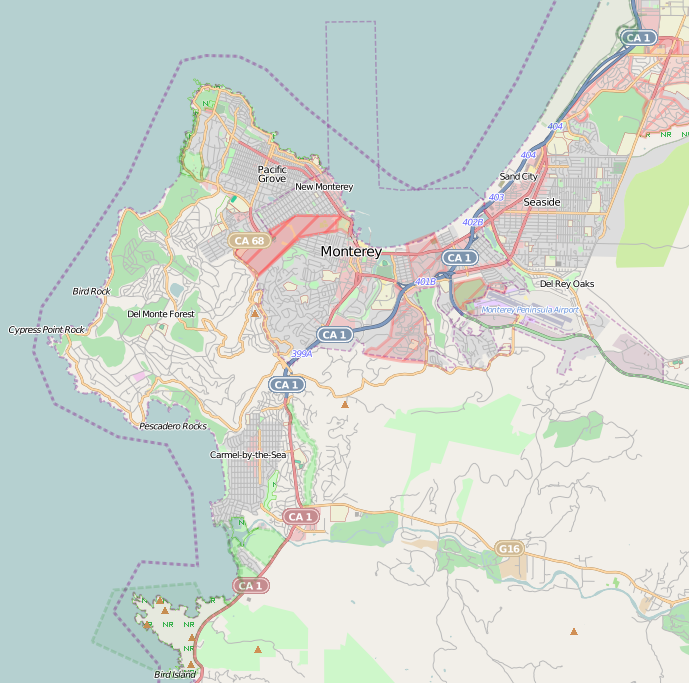
- Location in Monterey Peninsula Pebble Beach (California)
- Coordinates: 36°33′59″N 121°56′48″W
- Country: United States
- State: California
- County: Monterey
- Rancho Pescadero (Barreto): Established early 19th Century
- Elevation: 0 ft (0 m)
- Time zone: UTC−8 (Pacific)
  - Summer (DST): UTC−7 (PDT)
- ZIP code: 93953
- Area code: 831
- GNIS feature ID: 230455

Pebble Beach is an unincorporated community on the Monterey Peninsula in Monterey County, California, United States. The small coastal residential community of mostly single-family homes is also notable as a resort destination, and the home of the golf courses of Cypress Point Club, Monterey Peninsula Country Club, and Pebble Beach Golf Links. Nonresidents are charged a toll to use 17-Mile Drive, the main road through Pebble Beach, making it a de-facto gated community.

The Inn at Spanish Bay, The Lodge at Pebble Beach and four of the eight golf courses inside the Pebble Beach community are among the local assets owned by the Pebble Beach Company. Residents pay fees for maintenance as well as Monterey County property taxes. Application of the property tax revenues is the realm of the Pebble Beach Community Services District, a public agency that is independent of local private facilities, e.g., golf courses, with an elected board of directors that manages essential functions including fire protection and emergency medical services, supplemental law enforcement, wastewater collection and treatment, recycled water distribution, and garbage collection, disposal and recycling. The community's post office is named Pebble Beach, as is its identity; whereas, the U.S. Census Bureau aggregates census returns from Pebble Beach as part of the larger census-designated place of Del Monte Forest. However, residents and visitors associate and identify with the name Pebble Beach; boundaries of the Del Monte Forest extend outside of the Pebble Beach community boundaries encompassing a larger forest area that comprises the wooded parts of Monterey Peninsula.

Area open space is partly administered by the Del Monte Forest Conservancy, a non-profit organization designated by Monterey County and the California Coastal Commission to acquire and manage certain properties by conservation easement and, as well, by fee title. The Conservancy is governed by a self-elected volunteer board of up to 12 members working with a small part-time group of contractors and volunteers to preserve the open space within the Del Monte Forest and non-forested sites of Pebble Beach. All board members must be property owners and residents of Pebble Beach.

Pebble Beach lies at sea level. Its ZIP Code is 93953, and the community is inside area code 831.

== History ==
The name Pebble Beach was originally given to a rocky cove and beach strand, a prominent coastal segment of the Rancho Pescadero Mexican land grant that had been awarded to Fabián Barreto in 1836. Barreto died and the land went through several owners. In the 1850s, Chinese immigrants formed a series of fishing settlements along Carmel Bay including one at Stillwater Cove, next to Pebble Beach. They collected abalone and various fish. In 1860, David Jacks bought the Mexican land grant, then sold it in 1880 to the Pacific Improvement Company (PIC), a consortium of The Big Four "railroad barons".

By 1892, the PIC laid out a scenic road that they called the 17-Mile Drive, meandering along the beaches and among the forested areas between Monterey and Carmel. The drive was offered as a pleasure excursion to guests of the PIC-owned Hotel Del Monte, and it was intended to attract wealthy buyers of large and scenic residential plots on PIC land. Sightseers riding horses or carriages along the 17-Mile Drive sometimes stopped at Pebble Beach to pick up agate and other stones polished smooth by the waves, and they commented on a few unusual tree formations known as the Witch Tree and the Ostrich Tree—the latter formed by two trees leaning on each other. At that time, the Chinese fishing community continued in existence despite mounting anti-Chinese sentiment among Monterey residents of European heritage. At roadside stands, Chinese-American girls sold shells and polished pebbles to tourists. In the 1900s, the automobile began replacing horses on 17-Mile Drive, and by 1907 there were only automobiles. Adverse sentiments by local non-Chinese towards the Chinese fisherman and villagers of Pebble Beach was ironic in view of the vital contribution Chinese laborers made to the development of the Central Pacific Railroad, the fundamental fount of capital for the "Big Four", founders of PIC.

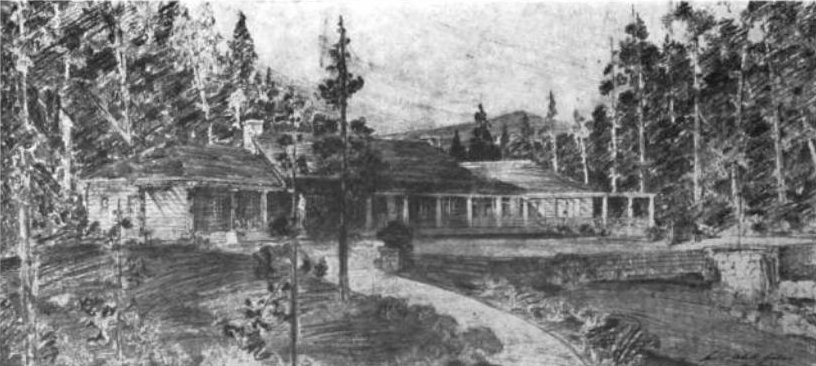
The original Pebble Beach Lodge, burned in 1917

In 1908, architect Lewis P. Hobart was hired by PIC manager A.D. Shepard to design the Pebble Beach Lodge, a rustic log-cabin-style one-story inn completed by 1909. The rambling lodge, featuring private patio nooks and a wide pergola made of local logs, was positioned halfway along 17-Mile Drive, overlooking Pebble Beach. The great hall or assembly room was 35 by 70 feet (11 by 21 m) wide and was flanked by massive fireplaces at each end. A tavern and kitchen supplied food and drink, and later, cottages could be rented for overnight guests. Operated under the same management as the Hotel Del Monte, food service was available at all hours, including fresh local abalone chowder. The lodge was built as the community center for the wealthy residents of the Del Monte Forest, and was popular as a rest stop for 17-Mile Drive motorists. Samuel Finley Brown Morse, a distant cousin to Samuel F. B. Morse known as the inventor of Morse Code, was hired in the 1910s to manage the PIC. In 1916, Morse convinced the PIC to create a golf course at the edge of Pebble Beach and Stillwater Cove. The lodge burned down on December 17, 1917, while the course was under construction, and a completely different structure replaced it: the Del Monte Lodge. PIC decided to dismantle the old El Carmelo Hotel and use the wood to reconstruction Del Monte Lodge. Hobart worked with Clarence Tantau to create a luxurious multi-story hotel, and Hobart designed a signature "Roman Plunge" pool to the east of the hotel. The golf course and the new lodge held a grand opening on February 22, 1919.

Morse formed the Del Monte Properties Company on February 27, 1919, and acquired the extensive holdings of the PIC, which included the Del Monte Forest, the Del Monte Lodge and the Hotel Del Monte. Morse brought his son, John Boit Morse, on board as president in 1948. The lodge was expanded with offices and a shopping arcade. In 1954, Morse's son-in-law, Richard Osborne was named president of the Del Monte Properties Company.

Samuel Finley Brown Morse died in 1969. Alfred Gawthrop Jr., served as Chairman of Del Monte Properties through the 1970s. On March 30, 1977, the Del Monte Properties Company was reincorporated as the Pebble Beach Corporation. The Del Monte Lodge was renamed the Lodge at Pebble Beach.

In May 1979, 20th Century Fox, later bought by Marvin Davis, purchased the Pebble Beach Corporation. When the film company was sold to Rupert Murdoch in 1985, Davis kept several company assets not directly related to the film and TV industry, including the Pebble Beach Company and the Aspen Skiing Company.

In 1990 Davis sold the Pebble Beach Company to the Japanese businessman Minoru Isutani, who made it a subsidiary of the Japanese resort company Taiheiyo Club Inc. under a holding company called the Lone Cypress Company. Isutani was investigated by the FBI in the early 1990s for money laundering. Isutani's $341M loss taken on the sale of Pebble Beach was cited as an example.

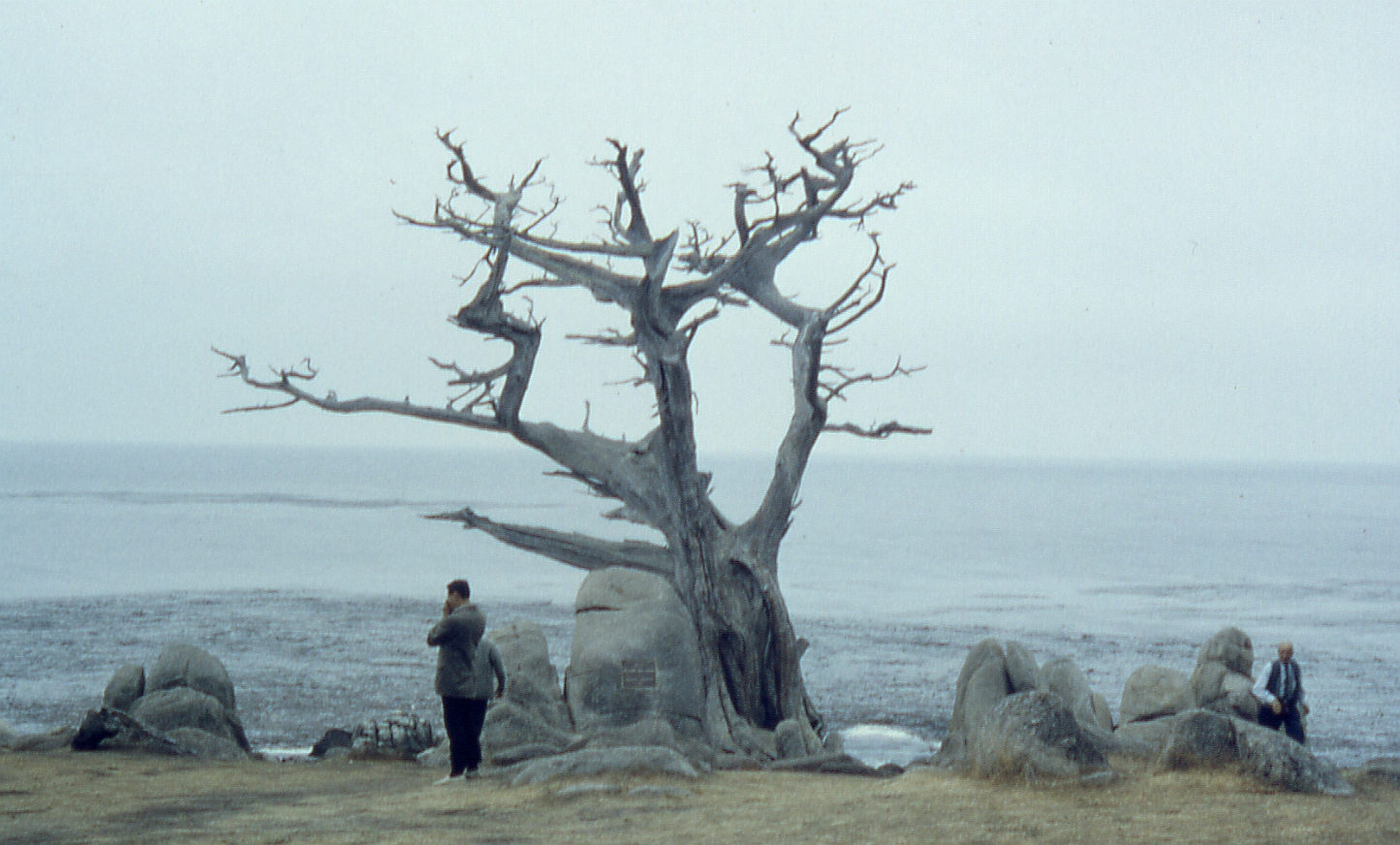
Famous "Witch Tree" landmark at Pescadero Point, Pebble Beach, September 1962. The tree was blown down by a storm on January 14, 1964.

In 1999 the Pebble Beach Company was acquired from Lone Cypress by an investor group led by Clint Eastwood, Arnold Palmer, and Peter Ueberroth. In 2000, the company initiated Measure A, a controversial development proposal. Eastwood appeared in a US$1 million legal and advertising campaign urging voters to pass Measure A. In 2006, the plan went before the California Coastal Commission for approval. On June 14, 2007, the plan was submitted again. Commissioner Sara Wan called it "wholesale destruction of the environment", and Measure A was denied in an 8 to 4 vote.

The famous landmark, known as the "Witch Tree", stood for decades at Pescadero Point until it fell during a storm on January 14, 1964. It was sometimes used as scenic background in movies and television. It was displayed as part of the coast of Italy, in the 1951 movie Mr. Imperium, with Lana Turner, Ezio Pinza, Majorie Main and Barry Sullivan. That tree was also part of the background in an early scene from the 1956 movie Julie, featuring Doris Day, while she was fleeing from her psychopathic husband, played by Louis Jourdan.

The Pescadero "Ghost Tree" gave its name to an extreme surfing location known to have storm waves as large as 60 feet (18 m) high. Effective 2009, the surf break of Ghost Tree became effectively off limits, the result of a decision by National Oceanic and Atmospheric Administration that personal watercraft, which were a virtual necessity for the tow-in only surf spot, were no longer permitted in specified waters of the Monterey Bay National Marine Sanctuary.

== Demographics ==
The community has 4,531 residents and is relatively affluent, home to many retirees and well-educated workers in the social service (education and health care), management and finance sectors. Monterey County has a large Hispanic population, accounting for 59% of its population. In contrast, Pebble Beach's population is largely of non-Hispanic White ancestry; 91.4% of the population was White, 5.3% Asian, 2.3% Hispanic or Latino, and 0.4% African American. The median household income is $99,788, with 54% with incomes between $50,000 and $150,000 and a little more than a quarter of households, 26.2%, with incomes exceeding $150,000. Also, 50.8% of households received social security income and 30.8% were retired. Less than half of the population 16 or over, 46.4%, are employed. Of those who work, the plurality (25%) are employed in the social service, education and health care sector, followed by the management (15%) and finance sectors (15%). 2.3% of the population live below the poverty level. The area's adult population is fairly well-educated, with 61% having at least a Bachelor's degree, and 98% having a high school diploma, compared to 25% and 80% at the national average, respectively.

== Golf ==
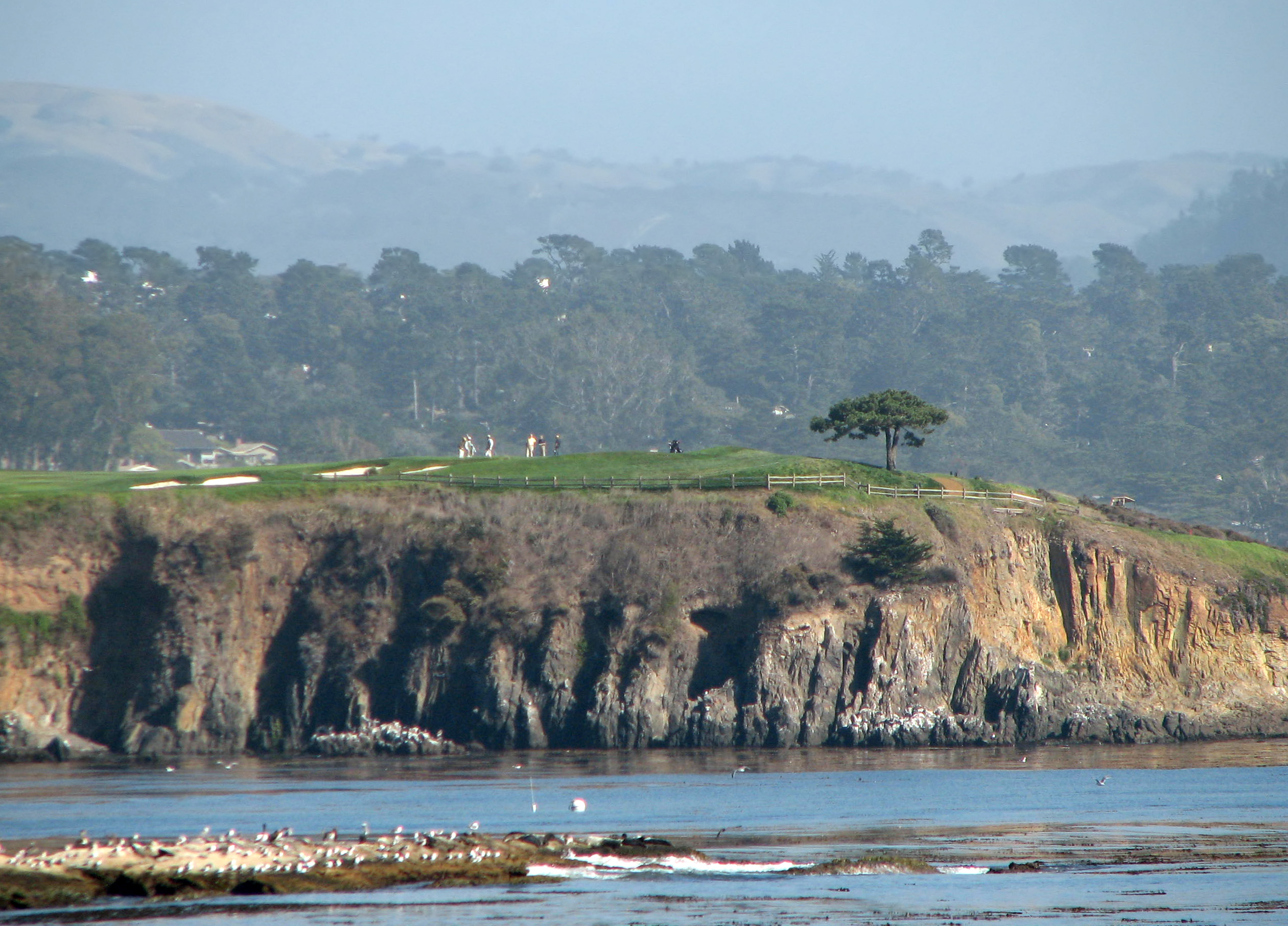
Sixth hole at Pebble Beach

Pebble Beach has seven 18-hole golf courses, and one 9-hole course. Pebble Beach Golf Links, The Links at Spanish Bay, Spyglass Hill and Peter Hay Golf Course are owned by Pebble Beach Company and are all public courses. Poppy Hills is also a public course. Private courses located at Pebble Beach are Cypress Point Club and the private Monterey Peninsula Country Club's two courses, the Dunes Course and the Shore Course. Pebble Beach Company also owns Del Monte Golf Course a few miles away in Monterey, which is the oldest continuously operating course in the Western United States.

Several of these courses are widely celebrated, especially Pebble Beach Golf Links. Designed by Jack Neville and Douglas Grant, it is the most famous course in the Western United States, and along with Augusta National remains one of only two courses to have ever beaten Pine Valley Golf Club to top spot in Golf Digest's biennial list of America's 100 greatest courses. Pebble Beach Golf Links was the site of the US Open in 1972, 1982, 1992, 2000, 2010 and 2019. The course is set to host the tournament again in 2027. It was the host of the 2023 U.S. Women's Open tournament for the first time, July 6–9, won by Allisen Corpuz.

The AT&T Pebble Beach National Pro-Am (formerly known as the Crosby Clambake) is held on two of the courses here annually in February. The tournament began in 1937 at Rancho Santa Fe near San Diego, where it was last played in 1942. After World War II, it moved to Pebble Beach in 1947, and has continued annually since.

The Pebble Beach golf resort partnered with IBM in 2017 to use the artificial intelligence Watson as a live concierge embedded in a mobile app. Watson was used to guide visitors around the resort.

== Concours d'Elegance ==
The annual Pebble Beach Concours d'Elegance auto show has been held in Pebble Beach since 1950. The event focuses on classic cars, and each year features a particular marque as its focus. In addition to the car competition, there is an auction, a classic car tour, and an automotive art exhibit.

== Representation ==
At the county level, Pebble Beach is represented as of 2025 on the Monterey County Board of Supervisors by Supervisor Kate Daniels.

In the State Assembly, Pebble Beach is in the 30th Assembly district, represented by Democrat Dawn Addis. In the State Senate, it is in the 17th senatorial district, represented by Democrat John Laird.

In the United States House of Representatives, Pebble Beach is in California's 19th congressional district, represented by Democrat Jimmy Panetta.

== Election results ==
Unlike most unincorporated communities, presidential election results are listed for Pebble Beach in the Monterey County statement of vote for some elections. The totals listed below are for the seven presidential elections from 1976 to 2000.

Pebble Beach city vote by party in presidential elections
Year	Democratic	Republican	Libertarian	Independents
2000	34.98% 1,102	59.68% 1,880	0.41% 13	4.92% 155
1996	31.42% 1,028	59.75% 1,955	1.04% 34	7.79% 255
1992	23.11% 392	42.81% 726	0.88% 15	33.20% 563
1988	27.79% 935	69.05% 2,323	1.25% 42	1.90% 64
1984	22.52% 757	70.40% 2,367	0.57% 19	6.51% 219
1980	15.56% 440	73.06% 2,067	1.38% 39	10.00% 283
1976	23.49% 640	73.02% 1,989	0.66% 18	2.83% 77

Notes:

- In the 1992 presidential election, Independent candidate Ross Perot received 281 votes (16.57%)
- The totals for the 1992 presidential election feature only the precincts that are presented in the linked document (pages that included the odd numbered precincts do not appear in the document)
- All totals listed include absentee balloting
- Totals are also available for Pebble Beach for gubernatorial elections from 1978 to 2002.
- In order to tabulate the totals for elections after 2002, the user would need to know the numbers of all precincts that make up the community of Pebble Beach, which are not clearly marked in the Monterey County statement of vote. Hence, they are not reproduced here.

== Geography ==
Pebble Beach is in Monterey County on the Monterey Peninsula at 36°33′59″N 121°56′48″W. It is bordered by Carmel-by-the-Sea to the south, Pacific Grove to the north, the City of Monterey to the east, and the Pacific Ocean to the west. Big Sur is about a 40-mile (64 km) drive south on scenic State Route 1. Cypress Point in Pebble Beach is the westernmost headland on the Monterey Peninsula; the dividing line between the north and south portions of the state coastline is situated at the center of the Monterey Bay shoreline near Moss Landing. Santa Cruz and San Francisco are about 45 and 120 miles (190 km) to the north, respectively.

== Geology ==
Pebble Beach owes much of its picturesque qualities to the granitic rock outcroppings, stacks and small islets visible along the coast, these comprising the local portion of the federal California Coastal National Monument, which is administered by the Department of Interior's Bureau of Land Management. These are characteristic of the Salinian Block, a geologic province which runs from the Baja California Peninsula and up through California west of the San Andreas Fault. The historically inactive Fanshell Beach Fault, which exits land near Fanshell Beach in Pebble Beach, creates a divide between nearby Cypress Point and northerly Spyglass Hill that is visually appreciable. Native Monterey Cypress forest grows on the south-westerly side of Fanshell Beach Fault: a direct relationship between the underlying rock base and soils and the cypress cover type has not been confirmed.

== Environmental issues ==
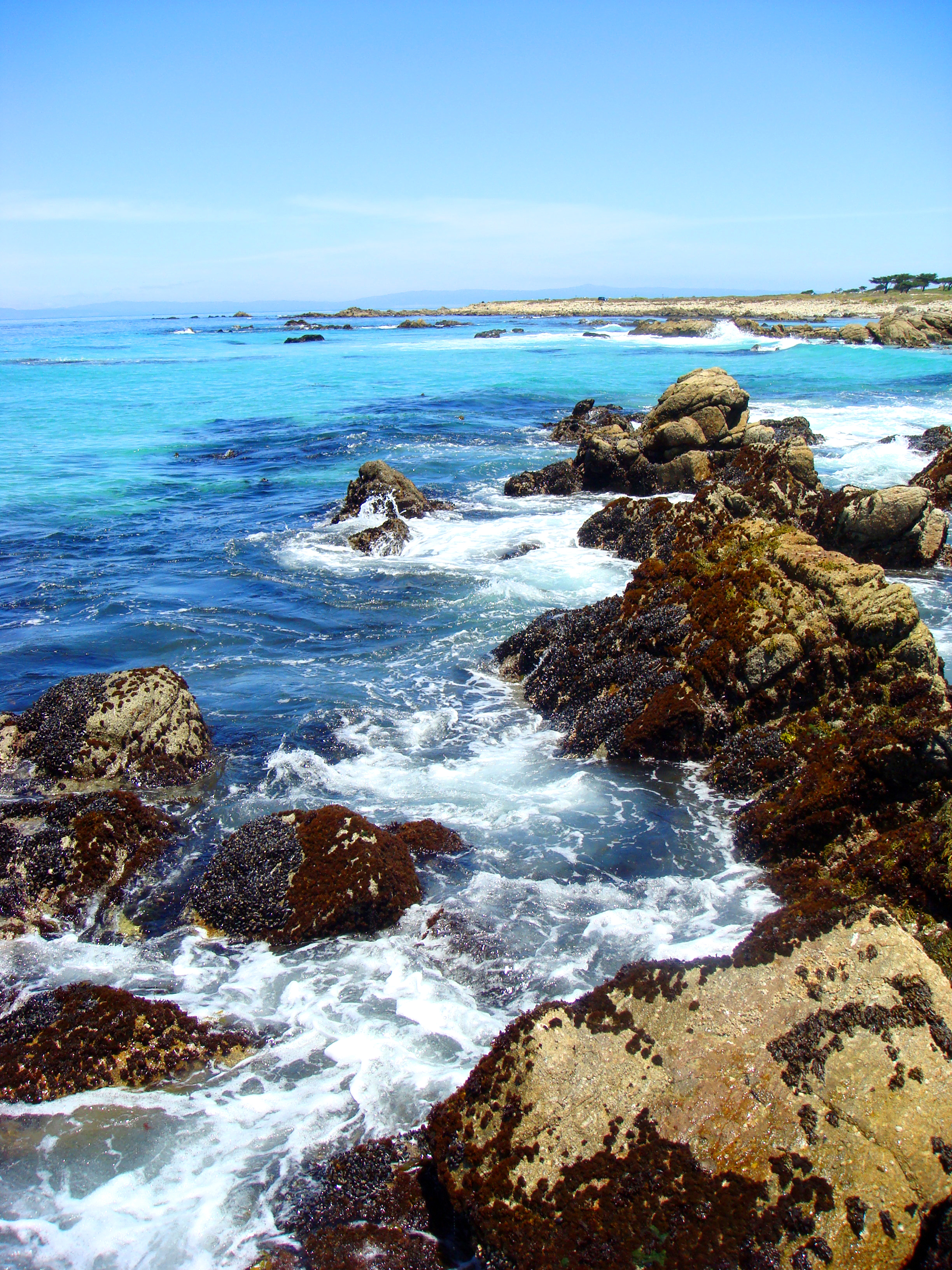
The California coastline at Bird Rock, Pebble Beach

There are several habitat types within Pebble Beach. These include intertidal zones, littoral and supralittoral and closed-cone coniferous forest, that encompasses, e.g., Monterey pine forest and Monterey cypress forest. The Monterey pine forest is habitat to numerous rare and endangered species, including Hickman's potentilla and Yadon's piperia, both of which are federally protected species. Hickman's potentilla was first discovered within the Del Monte Forest in present-day Pebble Beach by the botanist, Alice Eastwood in the year 1900. After a survey in 1992 by Earth Metrics Inc., this plant was listed as a protected species by the U.S. Government.

== Schools ==
The public schools serving Pebble Beach are Carmel High School, Carmel Middle School, and River School, all located in Carmel, and Forest Grove School, Pacific Grove Middle School, and Pacific Grove High School, all located in Pacific Grove. Pebble Beach is also home to Stevenson School, a co-ed half-boarding, half-day private high-school, located near the prestigious Spyglass golf course. The high school runs alternative radio station KSPB, which broadcasts BBC World Service when students are not operating the station.

== Other features ==
The Pebble Beach Authors & Ideas Festival has been held in September each year at Pebble Beach since 2013, after moving from its original venue at Carmel-by-the-Sea.

Pebble Beach has few businesses‍—‌such as at-home cottage industries‍—‌apart from those owned by the Pebble Beach Company (except the golf courses, a private school, and a deli) and no sidewalks. Most of the very expensive houses are obscured from view behind old-growth trees. It is quiet, secluded, and often experiences foggy weather, which occurs frequently on the Monterey Peninsula in general, but especially there because of the area adjoining the open ocean.

Pebble Beach is a gated community, but differs from most gated communities. There is an entrance fee for which The Pebble Beach Company charges $12.50 (per vehicle) from tourists driving along the 17-Mile Drive. Pebble Beach property owners may purchase small license plate badges that are attached near their cars' license plates or in their windshields to avoid paying the tourist fee. The badges are valid for one year, and their fee varies on the resident's property value.

In 2014 (airing 2017), Pebble Beach was the location for the show Big Little Lies, a drama which showcases relationships between high income status individuals based on the book of the same name.

== In popular culture ==
On the Star Trek: Voyager episode "Inside Man", the doctor (Robert Picardo) lists Pebble Beach as an option to play golf on the holodeck.

On The Golden Girls, Sophia Petrillo claims that she had the chance to marry Bing Crosby, and if she had, she would be a wealthy widow with her own place in Pebble Beach.

On Curb Your Enthusiasm episode "The Terrorist Attack", Larry David considers going golfing at Pebble Beach to avoid perishing in a potential terrorist attack in Los Angeles.

On the Modern Family episode "Planes, Trains and Cars", Jay, Gloria and Manny try to reach Jay's reunion in Pebble Beach.

== Notable people ==
- Al Bernardin, inventor of the Quarter Pounder
- Jane Bryan, film actress
- James Doolittle, combat pilot, Medal of Honor recipient
- Clint Eastwood, actor-director
- Allen Griffin, newspaper publisher
- Randall S. Herman, politician
- Pete Incaviglia, baseball player
- Hank Ketcham, cartoonist Dennis the Menace
- Gary Kildall, computer scientist and microcomputer entrepreneur
- Greg London, singer-actor-impressionist
- George Lopez, comedian
- Ingemar Henry Lundquist, inventor and mechanical engineer lived and worked at 17-Mile Drive and The Dunes, overlooking the fourth hole of the Spyglass Hill golf course
- Jim Nantz, sports broadcaster
- Condoleezza Rice, 66th US Secretary of State
- Tibor Rudas, musical impresario and originator of The Three Tenors
- Charles R. Schwab, stock broker
- Alan Shepard, astronaut
- Raymond Spruance, commander, 5th Fleet, U.S. Navy in World War II, commander of Pacific Fleet, 1945
