= Metro Santa Cruz =

- Type: Alternative weekly
- Format: Tabloid
- Owner(s): Metro Newspapers; Dan Pulcrano
- Publisher: Debra Whizin
- Editor: Traci Hukill
- Founded: 1994
- Ceased publication: Renamed Santa Cruz Weekly in 2009
- Language: English
- Headquarters: 115 Cooper St. Santa Cruz, CA 95060; United States
- Circulation: 33,000
- Price: Free
- Website: metrosantacruz.com

Metro Santa Cruz, a free-circulation weekly newspaper published in Santa Cruz, California, was published from 1994 to 2009 It was renamed the Santa Cruz Weekly on May 6, 2009 and continued for five years, under its new name, to cover news, arts and entertainment in Santa Cruz County, a coastal area that includes Capitola, Aptos, Boulder Creek, Scotts Valley and Watsonville.

In 2014, its owners purchased Good Times and the papers merged. The Good Times name was retained though the Metro Santa Cruz editorial staff, including editor Steve Palopoli and news editor Jake Pierce charted the joined publications’ editorial course.

Popular features of Metro Santa Cruz included Nuz, a free-wheeling un-bylined political column, the "ClubGrid" music calendar and Muz, a music column. The Nuz name was retired upon the publication's renaming.

Locally based in Santa Cruz, the alternative weekly was owned by Metro Newspapers, a company started by UC Santa Cruz graduate and former Santa Cruz publisher Dan Pulcrano. The company also publishes Metro in the adjacent Santa Clara Valley, a.k.a. Silicon Valley and the North Bay Bohemian in the Sonoma/Napa/Marin area.

The newspaper commemorated its 15th anniversary in April 2009 with a photographic tribute to prominent Santa Cruzans, including wet suit inventor Jack O'Neill, musicians Greg Camp and Dale Ockerman, former California secretary of state Bruce McPherson and others. The essay was photographed by Santa Cruz native Dina Scoppettone. The issue was the last one published under the Metro Santa Cruz name.

Though no announcement was made, the name change was foreshadowed in the final weeks. The word "weekly" was added to the front page logo, and in the final issue's front page, the word "Metro" is cut off and seemingly sliding off the left side of the page.
