= William J. Craddock =

American novelist

- Craddock, 1960s (Metro Silicon Valley July 12, 2012)
- Born: William J. Craddock; July 16, 1946; Los Gatos, California, U.S.
- Died: March 16, 2004 (aged 57); Santa Cruz, California, U.S.
- Occupation: Novelist
- Writing career
- Genres: Psychedelic, 1960s
- Subjects: motorcycles, counterculture
- Notable works: Twilight Candelabra; Be Not Content: A Subterranean Journal 1970)

William J. "Billy" Craddock (July 16, 1946 – March 16, 2004) was an American author who published two novels in the early 1970s chronicling psychedelic and biker culture in California in the 1960s. Doubleday published Craddock's books Be Not Content: A Subterranean Journal in 1970, and Twilight Candelabra in 1972. Craddock has been called one of the seminal chroniclers of the psychedelic period, along with Timothy Leary, Alan Watts and Andrew Weil.

== Biography ==
Craddock was born July 16, 1946, in San Jose, CA; son of William O. (an executive) and Camille J. (Hatch) Craddock. He grew up in Los Gatos, California. He graduated from Los Gatos High School in 1964 and moved to San Jose to attend San Jose State College (now San José State University).

Craddock was editor of the underground newspaper The Mobius Strip, in 1966 and 1967. Craddock also wrote a column for the Los Gatos Times-Observer and, later, for a weekly in Santa Cruz, California. In 2007, the family of Neal Cassady republished Craddock's February 3, 1968 column eulogizing Cassady, whom he'd met at a party thrown by Ken Kesey near San Francisco. "The faster-than-light, holy beat power behind On the Road is gone. Cody, the incredible, always moving, sad-mad Dharma Bum is dead," Craddock wrote.

He married Carole Anne Bronzich on November 27, 1967. The marriage ended in divorce. He married Teresa Lynn Thorne on July 27, 1975, and moved to Santa Cruz, California, where he lived until his death in 2004. In Santa Cruz, Craddock operated a retailer of restored vintage motorcycles with musician Patrick Simmons of the Doobie Brothers. Also in Santa Cruz, Craddock began a friendship with the journalist Jay Shore, who in 1972 began publishing the alternative weekly Santa Cruz Times with Craddock as a contributor. When Shore suspended the newspaper and relaunched in 1975 as the Good Times, Craddock joined as a weekly columnist, writing on a wide range of topics through 1989.

== Be Not Content ==
Be Not Content: A Subterranean Journal was published in 1970. The book is structured as a story within a story: Abel gives the book manuscript to his friend Curt, who is on an LSD trip. The manuscript is then found by a friend named "mindless Eddie" (a result of too much LSD) who then eats it page by page.

Contemporary reviews were mixed. Martin Levin reviewing it in the New York Times said the journal "contains a chain of remarkably fresh impressions of the drug scene ranging from the funny to the horrible," confirming the book had something to offer for everybody - including a member of the "whiskey subculture" like Levin. Kirkus Reviews compared it to a bad trip that took forever.

In 1998, an excerpt was anthologized in The Walls Of Illusion: A Psychedelic Retro, edited by Peter Haining - a reviewer in the Birmingham Post (UK) called Craddock's excerpt "a moderately interesting period piece - nothing more, nothing less." Craddock's account of Kesey's Dec 18, 1965 Muir Beach Acid Test was included as a chapter of The Grateful Dead Reader (2000) by David Dodd and Diana Spaulding. The authors wrote that Craddock's account "Achieves the very psychedelic feeling he was chronicling — something only a few writers have been able to do."

By 2012, Craddock's works had been out of print for 42 years. Metro Silicon Valley carried a cover article on Craddock which said "If the Los Gatos native is indeed one of the era's preeminent chroniclers, acknowledgment has lagged. Not even a Wikipedia bio. Out of print for four decades, copies of Craddock's scarce gems fetch hundreds of dollars online." In 2012, Rudy Rucker's Transreal Books republished Be Not Content in full. "Few certifiably clued-in alumni of that scene, it seems, were left with enough cognitive fortitude to compile the definitive tale of the tribe," wrote Wired magazine contributor Steve Silberman about the Be Not Content reissue. "Now, however, another title has been added to the very short list of engaging books about the golden age of neuro-hacking." He was also featured on the cover of the Santa Cruz Weekly in July 2012. In 2020, Jay Shore, founding editor and publisher of Good Times, published a 50th anniversary edition of Be Not Content under his Backtrack Publishing imprint, including a number of additional writings by Craddock and an introduction by Craddock's sister, Diane Craddock.
