= Weeklys =

Newspaper company based in San Jose, California, US

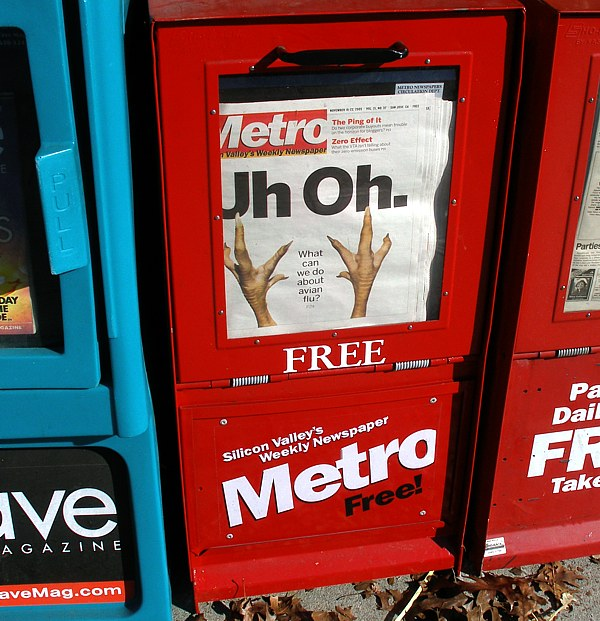
- A Metro news rack
- Type: Newspaper
- Founded: 1985
- Founder: Dan Pulcrano
- Headquarters: 380 S First Street; San Jose, California 95113
- Products: Alternative newspapers
- Website: weeklys.com

Weeklys, formerly known as Metro Newspapers, is an American media group established in 1985 and based in San Jose, California. The company is operated by its founder and longtime executive editor, Dan Pulcrano. It publishes alternative and community newspapers as well as magazines in Northern California.

The alt weeklies are free-distribution, tabloid-sized newspapers emphasizing news and analysis, local coverage and in-depth coverage of arts, culture and entertainment. The community newspapers are larger format broadsheet publications that are home delivered. Together, the publications reach a weekly audience of about half a million people, according to The Media Audit. Weeklys also operates digital publishing businesses.

== History ==
In 1985, Dan Pulcrano put together a group of local Silicon Valley and entertainment industry investors and recruited LA Weekly executive David Cohen as co-publisher to launch Metro. From an initial circulation of 40,000 it grew to approximately 100,000.

In 1990, Metro acquired Los Gatos Weekly, a newspaper Pulcrano had founded eight years earlier, and the Chicago Tribune-owned Los Gatos Times-Observer. The two were merged to become Los Gatos Weekly-Times.

In 1994, the company launched a second alt weekly called Metro Santa Cruz. That same year, Metro bought a stake in the Sonoma County Independent. In 2000, the newspaper was rebranded as the North Bay Bohemian and the circulation area was expanded to Marin and Napa counties.

In 2001, company co-founder David Cohen spun off five newspapers from Metro to form a new company called Silicon Valley Community Newspapers. The papers included the Saratoga News, Campbell Reporter, Cupertino Courier, Sunnyvale Sun and Willow Glen Resident.

In 2009, Metro Santa Cruz was renamed Santa Cruz Weekly. In 2014, Metro Newspapers acquired Good Times, the Gilroy Dispatch, the Hollister Free Lance and the Morgan Hill Times from Brookside Capital. Metro then merged Good Times with Santa Cruz Weekly.

In 2015, Metro acquired the Pacific Sun; the Bohemian ceased distribution in Marin County and increased its Sonoma County and Napa County distribution.

In 2019, the company acquired the King City Rustler, Soledad Bee, Greenfield News and Gonzales Tribune from News Media Corporation. That same year it purchased The Pajaronian.

In 2020, the company was renamed to Weeklys, acquired the East Bay Express, launched East Bay magazine, and acquired the Scotts Valley Press Banner. In 2021, Weeklys launched a new paper called the Los Gatan.

In 2022, Weeklys acquired Bay Area Parent from Dominion Enterprises, and bought the recently closed Healdsburg Tribune and relaunched it. In 2026, Weeklys acquired the Los Altos Town Crier.

== Publications ==
=== Alternative Weeklies ===
- Good Times
- East Bay Express
- Metro Silicon Valley
- North Bay Bohemian
- Pacific Sun

=== Community Weeklies ===
- Gilroy Dispatch
- Greenfield News
- The Healdsburg Tribune
- Hollister Free Lance
- King City Rustler
- Los Altos Town Crier
- Los Gatan
- The Morgan Hill Times
- The Pajaronian
- Press Banner
- Salinas Valley Tribune
- Soledad Bee
- Tri-City Voice

=== Magazines ===
- Bay Area Parent
- Bohéme - North Bay
- Cannabis Chronicle
- East Bay Magazine
- South Valley Magazine

== Silicon Valley Community Newspapers ==
Metro developed a group of weekly community newspapers, including the Los Gatos Weekly-Times, Saratoga News, Campbell Reporter, Willow Glen Resident and Sunnyvale Sun. On December 17, 2001, David Cohen, a co-founder of Metro, bought the group, which at the time included six publications and left to run Silicon Valley Community Newspapers as an independent company. Cohen sold it three years later to Knight Ridder which sold the group to McClatchy. McClatchy immediately resold SVCN to Dean Singleton's MediaNews Group. In 2014, Bay Area News Group marketing director Erika Brown announced that the newspapers would be distributed to subscribers of the Mercury News, rather than generally to homes in the community.

== Alumni ==
The company has a number of notable alumni, including British television journalist Louis Theroux, New York Times opinion writer Michelle Goldberg, former News Director of Vice News Michael Learmonth, typographer Conor Mangat and film producer Zack Stentz Metro Silicon Valley was one of the first newspapers to publish Matt Groening's Life in Hell comic strip, long before he created The Simpsons, and Rob Brezsny's Real Astrology.
