= Santa Cruz Weekly =

Newspaper in California, US

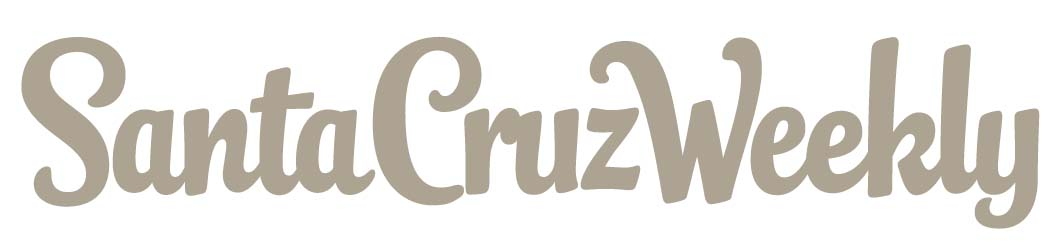

- Front page of the May 27, 2009 edition of the Santa Cruz Weekly
- Type: Alternative weekly
- Format: Tabloid
- Owner(s): Metro Newspapers; Dan Pulcrano
- Publisher: Jeanne Howard
- Editor: Steve Palopoli
- Founded: 2009; predecessor founded 1994
- Ceased publication: April 2, 2014
- Language: English
- Headquarters: 877 Cedar St. Ste 147; Santa Cruz, CA 95060
- Circulation: 33,000
- Price: Free
- Website: www.santacruzweekly.com

Santa Cruz Weekly was a free-circulation weekly newspaper published in Santa Cruz, California. It began publishing under its current name on May 6, 2009; publication ceased when operations were merged with the competing Good Times weekly on April 2, 2014, with the merged company continuing as Good Times. Formerly known as Metro Santa Cruz, the alternative weekly covered news, people, culture and entertainment in Santa Cruz County, a coastal area that includes Capitola, Aptos, Boulder Creek, Scotts Valley and Watsonville.

Locally based in Santa Cruz, the alternative weekly was owned by Metro Newspapers, a company started by Santa Cruz publisher Dan Pulcrano. The company also published Metro in the adjacent Santa Clara Valley, a.k.a. Silicon Valley and the North Bay Bohemian in the Sonoma/Napa/Marin area. In 2014, Metro bought the competing alternative weekly, Good Times, and merged the two papers under the Good Times banner.

== Founded as Metro Santa Cruz ==
Metro Santa Cruz began publishing in 1994 and continued under that name until it became Santa Cruz Weekly in 2009. The founding editors' stated objective was to continue a local tradition of independent journalism that had included such publications as Free Spaghetti Dinner, Sundaze, Santa Cruz Independent, an unrelated publication in the 1980s called Santa Cruz Weekly, Santa Cruz Express and Santa Cruz Sun.

== Relaunched under new name ==
The name change remained a secret until the publication hit the streets on May 6, 2009. The design was developed in-house by a team led by Metro Newspapers design director Kara Brown. The first issue featured a black and white illustration by longtime Santa Cruz illustrator Futzie Nutzle and a cover story on the Santa Cruz Film Festival. The editors stated that they selected the name because they were tired of being confused with the local public transit system of the same name, as well as to throw down a stake for newspapers following the shutdowns of several daily newspapers in early 2009, including the Rocky Mountain News and Seattle Post-Intelligencer. "At a transformative moment in the publishing industry, we've adopted a decidedly newspaper-y name to express our optimism about weekly print," they wrote and suggested that business was rising rather than declining like the rest of the industry. "From a business standpoint, the last two years have been our best ones, which is counterintuitive," the signed editorial stated.

The Santa Cruz Weekly's logo was drawn by noted Northern California typeface designer Jim Parkinson.

== Web and social media strategy ==
The publication was affiliated with the SantaCruz.com community web portal, operated by a sister company, Boulevards New Media. In a decidedly 2009 twist, its Twitter and Facebook pages went live in advance of the print edition, a launch strategy that established social media presence before papers hit the street. "Our goal is to deliver Santa Cruz County's best suite of local information and marketing services to Santa Cruz residents, visitors and businesses," the editors wrote.

== Purchase of Good Times ==
On March 31, 2014, the Weekly's publishers announced that the company had acquired its principal competitor, Good Times, after which the SCW was folded into GT, the combined newspapers continuing under the better-established Good Times name.

== Awards ==
- Alt-Weekly Awards awarded by the Association of Alternative Newsweeklies
- Feature Writing, 2nd Place (Life and Death on The Pajaro River Levee, Jessica Lussenhop), 2010
- Multimedia, 2nd Place (The Aztecas of South Santa Cruz County, Jessica Lussenhop), 2010
- Food Writing, 1st Place (The Jester's Quest, Christina Waters), 2009
- Arts Feature, 3rd Place (Unlock & Roll, Curtis Cartier), 2009
- Editorial Layout, 2nd Place (Kara Brown and Tabi Zarrinnaal), 2007
- Food Writing, 1st Place (Kraut in the Act by Steve Billings), 2005
- Music Criticism, 3rd Place (Steve Palopoli), 2005
- Music Criticism, 2nd Place (David Espinoza), 2001
- Photography, 1st Place (Breadth of Life by George Sakkestad), 2000
- Arts Criticism, 2nd Place (J. Douglas Allen-Taylor), 1999
- Arts Criticism, 1st Place (Power Flick People by Traci Hukill), 1998
- Film Criticism, 1st Place (The Prince of Plots by Richard von Busack), 1998
- Arts Feature, 2nd Place (Mint Condition by Christina Waters), 1997; Photography, 1st Place (Robert Scheer), 1997
- Food Writing, 1st Place: (Waiting For Merlot by Christina Waters), 1996
