= Press Banner =

Weekly newspaper in Scotts Valley, California

The Press Banner
- Type: Weekly newspaper
- Owner: Weeklys
- Founder(s): Ray Smith; Vic McDonald
- Founded: 1960
- Language: English
- Headquarters: Scotts Valley, CA
- Sister newspapers: Good Times, The Pajaronian Metro Silicon Valley
- Website: pressbanner.com

The Press Banner is a local newspaper serving Scotts Valley and San Lorenzo Valley, California in Santa Cruz County in the United States. It is published once per week on Fridays. It is operated by Weeklys which also publishes the countywide free weekly Good Times, the monthly Aptos Life and Watsonville-based The Pajaronian.

== History ==
On December 2, 1960, the first edition of the Valley Press was published by Ray Smith and Vic McDonald. Smith owned a small print shop in Felton and started the paper after The Highlander, formerly the Ben Lomond Courier, ceased. Two years later the paper was bought by Craig M. Robinson. On Feb. 27, 1974, Robinson founded another paper called The Scotts Valley Banner. He sold both papers in 1978 to John P. Scripps Newspaper Group, owner of the Watsonville Register-Pajaronian.

Jack Fraiser bought the papers from the company in 1989. The new owner got his start at the Honolulu Star-Bulletin and previously operated The Bastrop Advertiser and the Bastrop County Times in Texas. Fraiser sold the Press and Banner in 1996 for $350,000 to Melmac Media, a company owned by Michael and Elaine Quinn. At the time the papers had a combined circulation of 8,300. In 2000, Johnson Newspapers acquired the papers. Carlon Perry served as company president and the business previously owned the Colusa County Sun Herald, The Loomis News and the Williams Farmer.

In 2005, Carlon Perry and Cecelia Drake, co-publishers of the papers, announced they had been sold to the Mathews family, who owned the Tracy Press. A year later the Valley Press and Banner were merged to form the Press Banner. Tracy Press Inc. went bankrupt in 2012 and the Tracy Press, the Patterson Irrigator and the Press Banner were sold to Will Fleet and Ralph Alldredge, under the name Tank Town Media. In 2020, the Press Banner was acquired by Metro Newspapers, publisher of Good Times in neighboring Santa Cruz.
