= East Bay Express =

Oakland-based weekly newspaper

- Type: Alternative weekly
- Format: Tabloid
- Owner: Weeklys
- Publisher: Dan Pulcrano
- Editor: Samantha Campos
- Founded: October 1978; 48 years ago
- Website: eastbayexpress.com

The East Bay Express is an Oakland-based weekly newspaper serving the Berkeley, Oakland, and East Bay regions of the San Francisco Bay Area. It is distributed throughout Alameda County and parts of Contra Costa County every Wednesday.

The Express is known for its investigative and longform news and feature stories, along with its arts, food and wine coverage. The paper is also well known for its opinionated viewpoint and for engaging in advocacy journalism.

A typical issue of the Express contains one or two in-depth news stories; an "Eco Watch" column about environmental issues; a political column called Seven Days; a cover story, events and music listings; music, dining and movie reviews; a culture column; a parenting column; a tech column; and the syndicated Free Will Astrology column. Daedalus Howell served as editor-at-large after its sale by Telegraph Media to Metro Newspapers in the spring of 2020. As of September 1, 2023, Samantha Campos was named editor.

== History ==
The first edition of the Express was published in October 1978, during Governor Jerry Brown's first stint as governor of California. The Express was an independent publication at the time and its first editor was veteran journalist John Raeside; 1978 also saw the passage of Proposition 13 and the election of Oakland's first African-American mayor, Lionel Wilson. During the 1980s, the paper covered the rise and fall of Oakland drug lords Felix Mitchell and Mickey Moore, the closure of the Keystone Berkeley nightclub and student protests at UC Berkeley that urged the regents to divest from apartheid South Africa. In 1989, the Express reported extensively on the 1989 Loma Prieta earthquake and the collapse of the Cypress Structure on I-880.

In the 1990s, the paper reported on the devastating 1991 East Bay Hills firestorm; the decision by Mills College in Oakland to admit male students for the first time; the rise of the crack cocaine epidemic; the rapid growth of development in Emeryville; the passage of the anti-immigration measure, Prop 187; the closure of East Bay military bases; the election of ex-state legislator Elihu Harris as mayor of Oakland; the return of the Oakland Raiders from Los Angeles; and the election of Jerry Brown as mayor of Oakland.

The paper was sold in February, 2001 to New Times Media. Editor John Raeside was replaced as editor of the Express by longtime journalist Stephen Buel, and the Express' new tabloid layout replaced the original quarter-fold design. In October 2006, New Times merged with the parent company of The Village Voice to form Village Voice Media.

During the Aughts, the Express was the first news outlet to report on the bloody legacy of Your Black Muslim Bakery in Oakland. Members of the bakery were later convicted of murdering Oakland journalist Chauncey Bailey. Throughout the decade, the Express also closely covered the FBI investigation of then-state Senator Don Perata of Oakland. In addition, the paper reported on The Riders scandal in the Oakland Police Department; the rise of the hyphy music scene; the election of Ron Dellums as mayor of Oakland; and the Oakland A's' aborted attempts to move to Fremont and San Jose.

On 17 May 2007, Village Voice Media announced the Express was being bought by then-editor Stephen Buel and a group of investors including Hal Brody. Jody Colley became publisher that year, and then Jay Youngdahl acquired majority control of the paper in August 2010. In December 2010, co-editors Robert Gammon and Kathleen Richards took over for Stephen Buel.

In 2010, Express reported on the election of Jean Quan as mayor of Oakland; Quan defeated ex-state Senator Don Perata. During the decade, the paper also covered the rise of progressives in Richmond, the tenure of Mayor Tom Bates in Berkeley, the growth of Oakland's food scene and the election of Libby Schaaf as mayor of Oakland. In 2014, Robert Gammon became sole editor of the paper when Kathleen Richards moved to Seattle to serve as editor of The Stranger. Nick Miller came to the Express as editor in 2016.

In 2017, Telegraph Media, owned by Stephen Buel and Judith Gallman, acquired the Express. Kathleen Richards returned as editor-in-chief and Buel, who had been editor from 2001 to 2010, became publisher. Buel resigned this role in 2018 after a dispute with writers about removed blog posts about race issues in music. Gammon then took on the role of publisher of the Express, and became editor again later in the year as well when Richards left, while Buel and Gallman remained majority owners.

In early 2019, following a court ruling against the Express in a lawsuit and in the midst of Buel and Gallman's ongoing efforts to sell their publications, management laid off six employees (including most of the editorial staff), at which point Buel again took on the role of publisher. Less than a month later, Gammon left the paper to take a position in the office of California State Senator Nancy Skinner.

In March 2020, the Express was sold to Weeklys, a 17-title regional media group that includes the North Bay Bohemian, the Pacific Sun, Santa Cruz’s Good Times, and Metro Silicon Valley.

== Awards ==
In 2004, staff writer Kara Platoni won the Evert Clark/Seth Payne Award, a national prize given to young science writers.

In 2005, the International Society of Weekly Newspaper Editors honored Express columnist Chris Thompson with one of its prestigious 2005 Golden Dozen Awards. The National Association of Black Journalists awarded a first place honor to Lauren Gard for "Good Kids, Bad Blood." Kara Platoni won a Clarion Award for best newspaper feature story for "The Ten Million Dollar Woman."

In 2006, Jonathan Kauffman won top honors for restaurant criticism from the national Association of Food Journalists in its 2006 awards contest. And Anneli Rufus was honored for criticism in the 2006 Excellence in Journalism awards, hosted by the Northern California chapter of the Society of Professional Journalists. Express won first-place awards in the 2006 Missouri Lifestyle Journalism Awards. In the Fashion and Design category, Kara Platoni won for "What a Steal!" (3/11/04). In the Food and Nutrition category, Will Harper won for "The O Word" (1/5/05).

In 2011, Express won a first-place award in the 2011 Price Child Health and Welfare Journalism contest for "Pushing Foster Children off the Plank" by Angela Kilduff.

In 2012, Express won three honors: The Northern California Independent Booksellers Association gave an award to publisher Jody Colley; Ali Winston, Joaquin Palomino and Robert Gammon were honored by PUEBLO, Oakland's police watchdog group; and Rachel Swan won an excellence in journalism award from the Society of Professional Journalists of Northern California.

In 2013, Express won a national award for journalism excellence in science reporting from the American Association for the Advancement of Science for Azeen Ghorayshi's story, "Warning: Quake in 60 Seconds."

== Notable stories ==
Express humorist Alice Kahn claimed to have coined the word "yuppie" in a 1983 column. This claim is disputed, but no definitive origin for the word has been determined.

In 2002, the paper's coverage played a crucial role in uncovering the Your Black Muslim Bakery scandal.

The Express placed actor Gary Coleman on the ballot for governor in the 2003 California recall election as a satirical comment on the recall of Democratic Governor Gray Davis.

A 2005 profile of the environmentalist Van Jones noted that he had, in his youth, identified as a "communist" and been a member of the activist group Standing Together to Organize a Revolutionary Movement (STORM).

In February 2009, the paper uncovered an alleged extortion scam by the user review website Yelp Inc. After the story's publication, several lawsuits were filed against the company.
