= Around the Bay =

- Directed by: Alejandro Adams
- Written by: Alejandro Adams
- Produced by: Alejandro Adams; Marya Murphy
- Starring: Steve Voldseth; Katherine Celio; Connor Maselli
- Cinematography: Alejandro Adams; Christopher Sanborn Taylor; Casey Wilms
- Edited by: Alejandro Adams; Marya Murphy
- Release date: 1 March 2008 (Cinequest Film Festival)
- Running time: 96 minutes
- Country: United States
- Language: English

Around the Bay is a 2008 American drama film directed by Alejandro Adams, starring Steve Voldseth, Katherine Celio, and Connor Maselli.

== Cast ==
- Steve Voldseth as Wyatt
- Katherine Celio as Daisy
- Connor Maselli as Noah
- Katherine Darling as Noreen
- Michael Umansky as Aleksey
- Bronica DeCarlo as Megan
- Sherrill Lawrence as Helen
- Debra Niestat as Polly
- Katelyn Sacks as The Hairstylist
- Larry Kitagawa as Alan
- Valerie Weak as Gloria
- Bob Skubis as The Jeweler

== Release ==
The film premiered at the Cinequest Film Festival on 1 March 2008.

== Reception ==
Richard von Busack of Metro Silicon Valley wrote: "Voldseth's first-rate performance and Adams' direction match the much-praised exposure of soul-barrenness in There Will Be Blood, with none of the attendant melodrama."

Michael Guillen of Screen Anarchy wrote: "In an impressionistic narrative of assembled visual episodes Alejandro Adams articulates the dysfunction of a fractured family with eloquent precision and exact focus. The effect is polished and lapidary, but not without warmth and hope."

Charlie Olsky of IndieWire wrote: "Every single moment of the story rings true, aided by uniformly excellent performances by the unknown cast, particularly Katherine Ceilo as the aimless young protagonist."

Sara Scheiron of Rotten Tomatoes wrote that the film "intelligently plays at the disintegration of family in the face of struggling business in the Silicon Valley."

Dennis Harvey of Variety called the film "bracing", "intimate" and "involving, if not wholly satisfying".
