= Zack Stentz =

American screenwriter

Zackary Stentz
- Born: Fort Bragg, California, U.S.
- Education: University of California, Santa Cruz (BA)
- Occupations: Writer, Producer
- Notable credit(s): Agent Cody Banks, Thor, X-Men: First Class, Terminator: The Sarah Connor Chronicles
- Height: 5 ft 11 in (180 cm)
- Spouse: Leah Glynn
- Website: https://twitter.com/MuseZack

Zackary Lowell Stentz is an American writer and producer of film and television, journalist, novelist, and teacher, best known for his work on Marvel properties with former writing partner Ashley Edward Miller.

== Career ==
Stentz graduated from UC Santa Cruz with a degree in journalism. As a journalist, he wrote and edited for publications such as The Economist, Esquire, Sports Illustrated, and Entertainment Weekly. In addition, he was an environmental activist for Earth First! in the early 1990s.

After graduating from UC Santa Cruz with a degree in journalism, he worked for Metro Silicon Valley, writing about television, books and popular culture, as well as the Sonoma County Independent (now the North Bay Bohemian) In 1997, publisher Dan Pulcrano tapped Stentz to oversee Metro's rebranding and launch of its San Francisco monthly, The Metropolitan.

After turning to screenwriting full-time, from 2000 to 2015 he worked with writing partner Ashley Edward Miller, beginning with Gene Roddenberry's Andromeda. As a team, they co-wrote the films X-Men: First Class, the Marvel Cinematic Universe film Thor, and Agent Cody Banks.

He and Miller did some of the initial work on the project that became Top Gun: Maverick, a sequel to the 1986 Tom Cruise film Top Gun, released in 2022. As writer and producer, he worked on the Netflix science fiction adventure film Rim of the World (2019), directed by McG.

He has written and produced multiple television programs, including Gene Roddenberry's Andromeda, The CW's The Flash, Fox's Fringe, and Fox's Terminator: The Sarah Connor Chronicles. He also created and developed the animated show Jurassic World Camp Cretaceous for Netflix.

He has several projects in development, including television programs for Skydance Television, Warner Bros., and HBO, as well as the DC superhero film Booster Gold at Warner Bros. and a remake of Big Trouble in Little China at Fox.

Additionally, he co-wrote the acclaimed young adult novel Colin Fischer, and is currently writing an adventure/thriller entitled Nevermore.

He also teaches screenwriting in the United States and in China. He was a guest of the Wutianming Foundation in Tianjin, and of Wanda Studios in Beijing, where he taught young Chinese screenwriters the tricks and techniques of writing American action movies.

== Personal life ==
A native of Fort Bragg, California, Stentz was born to a father of German and Irish descent and a mother of Lebanese descent and has described himself as half-Lebanese. He has stated that he has Asperger syndrome, and that two of his three children are also autistic.

== Writing credits ==
Film

- Agent Cody Banks (2003)
- Thor (2011)
- X-Men: First Class (2011)
- Rim of the World (2019) (Also executive producer)

Television

Year	Title	Notes
2001–2005	Andromeda	40 episodes; Also consultant
2003	The Twilight Zone	Episode: "Cold Fusion"
2008–2009	Terminator: The Sarah Connor Chronicles	8 episodes
2009–2010	Fringe	4 episodes
2016–2019	The Flash	4 episodes; Also consulting producer
2020–2022	Jurassic World Camp Cretaceous	50 episodes; Also creator and consulting producer
2024–2025	Jurassic World: Chaos Theory	39 episodes; Also co-creator and consulting producer

== Bibliography ==
- Stentz, Zack &; Miller, Ashley Edward (2013). Colin Fischer. Penguin Books. ISBN 978-0141343990.
- Stentz, Zack. Nevermore.
