= Los Altos Town Crier =

Newspaper in Los Altos, California

- Type: Weekly newspaper
- Format: Broadsheet
- Owner: Weeklys
- Founder: Dave MacKenzie
- Publisher: Howard Bischoff; Dennis Young
- Editor-in-chief: Clarke Condé
- Founded: 1947
- Language: English
- Headquarters: Los Altos, California
- Circulation: 16,500
- OCLC number: 39165121
- Website: losaltosonline.com

The Los Altos Town Crier is an America paid newspaper owned by Weeklys which serves the city of Los Altos and surrounding Santa Clara County, California. The newspaper was founded in 1947 and covers local news, sports, business and community events. It is published weekly on Wednesday and is mailed to 15,000 households across Los Altos, Los Altos Hills and Mountain View.

== History ==
In 1947, David "Dave" MacKenzie founded the Los Altos Town Crier. In 1953, MacKenzie and William J. Norton, publisher of the Cupertino Courier, merged their businesses together. In 1972, MacKenzie and Norton sold the Town Crier, Courier and Sunnyvale Scribe to Suburban Newspaper Publishers Inc., owned by Mort Levine. The company published five other papers in the Santa Clara Valley.

In 1973, Meredith Corporation acquired the Town Crier after it purchased 24 papers in the Los Angeles Metropolitan Area, nine from Hicks-Deal Publications, Inc. and 15 from Publishers Associates Inc. In 1986, Meredith sold is 11 weekly Santa Clara County newspapers to one of its executives, Terry Donnelly. The sale included the Town Crier, the Courier, and the Mountain View Scribe. In 1988, Donnelly sold five papers (Town Crier, Courier, Los Gatos Times-Observer, Milpitas Post and Saratoga News) to Tribune Co., owner of Peninsula Times Tribune and three weeklies in the county.

In 1993, Tribune Co. closed the Peninsula Times Tribune, putting the Los Altos Town Crier, Cupertino Courier and Mountain View Town Crier at risk of closure. But the three free weekly papers were saved when Paul and Liz Nyberg purchased them. In 2019, three employees and Los Altos businessman Dennis Young bought the Town Crier from the Nybergs. The new ownership team, LATC Media Inc, included co-publishers Young and Howard Bischoff, Vice President of Operations Chris Redden and Vice President of Sales and Marketing Kathy Lera. In 2026, Weeklys acquired the Town Crier.
