= Tracy Press =

American weekly newspaper

- Type: Weekly newspaper
- Format: Tabloid
- Owner: Tank Town Media
- Founder: W. W. Felts
- Publisher: Will Fleet
- Photo editor: Glenn Moore
- Founded: April 2, 1898
- Language: English
- Headquarters: 95 W. 11th St., Ste. 101, Tracy, California
- Sister newspapers: Patterson Irrigator
- Website: tracypress.com

The Tracy Press is a weekly newspaper published in Tracy, California, United States. As of 2014, the paper has an average weekly circulation of over 10,000 and covers both Tracy and Mountain House.

== History ==
The Tracy Exponent was established in 1892 by W. W. Felts, who soon changed the name to The Tracy Times. The following year he sold the newspaper to Thomas Duffy, who after less than a year sold it to D. J. Looney. It was under Looney the name was changed to Tracy Press. Frank P. Anderson and Charles P. Fox purchased the paper in 1899, but soon sold it to Rev. William Paul Friedrich.

In 1911, Ida M, Ross, who for a few months published a rival paper, acquired The Press and ran it until most of the town's business district was destroyed in a fire in February 1912. Henry Hull then owned the paper for a few decades until selling to Harvey F. Mathews on July 1, 1943. After his death in 1949, his wife Laura E. Mathews assumed management of the paper followed by her sons Thomas F. and Samuel H. Mathews.

In 2003, the Mathews bought the Patterson Irrigator in Patterson. A year later the Press was designed to a tabloid format and eliminated its Sunday edition. In 2007, the paper cut back from five issues a week to three. A year later it cut back to two weekly issues and laid off several employees. At that time the circulation was 9,700. In 2009, the Press absorbed the Sun Post, a free tabloid in Manteca. In 2012, Tracy Press Inc., which was owned by the Matthews family, declared bankruptcy and was sold on Nov. 12 to Will Fleet and Ralph Alldredge, under the name Tank Town Media. Fleet was publisher of The Fresno Bee, and Alldredge owned the Calaveras Enterprise. He died in 2022.

== 2006 Political Coverage ==
Leading up to the 2006 U.S. Congressional Election, Tracy Press articles and editorials were widely discussed in state and national news and opinion forums, from the Democratic Congressional Campaign Committee to Amy Ridenour's National Center for Public Policy Research blog, due to the Press being the hometown newspaper of the embattled United States Representative Richard Pombo. The Tracy Press-sponsored forum held October 6, 2006 turned out to be the only time that Pombo and challenger Jerry McNerney faced voters on the same stage after Pombo declined debate invitations from groups such as the League of Women Voters.

== Freedom of information ==
The Tracy Press filed a California Public Records Act request in 2007, seeking copies of e-mails sent from the personal e-mail account of Tracy Vice Mayor Suzanne Tucker. The e-mails were sent to Lawrence Livermore National Laboratory officials and concerned the manner in which a public forum about the research laboratory would be conducted. Since the e-mails were about city business, attorneys for the Tracy Press argued that copies should be made available to the public. A San Joaquin County Superior Court judge ruled against the Tracy Press, saying that since the e-mails were created and kept on Tucker's personal computer, and were never used, owned, possessed or sent by the city, they are not public records. The Tracy Press appealed the ruling and the California Court of Appeal (3rd District) ruled in favor of the City of Tracy on procedural grounds.

== Other publications ==
In addition to the Tracy Press, Tank Town Media also publishes the Patterson Irrigator in Patterson. The company also owned the Scotts Valley Press Banner from 2005 until 2020 when it was sold to Metro Newspapers. The company purchased the Chino Valley Champion in 2017.
