= Chino Valley Champion =

Weekly newspaper in Chino, California

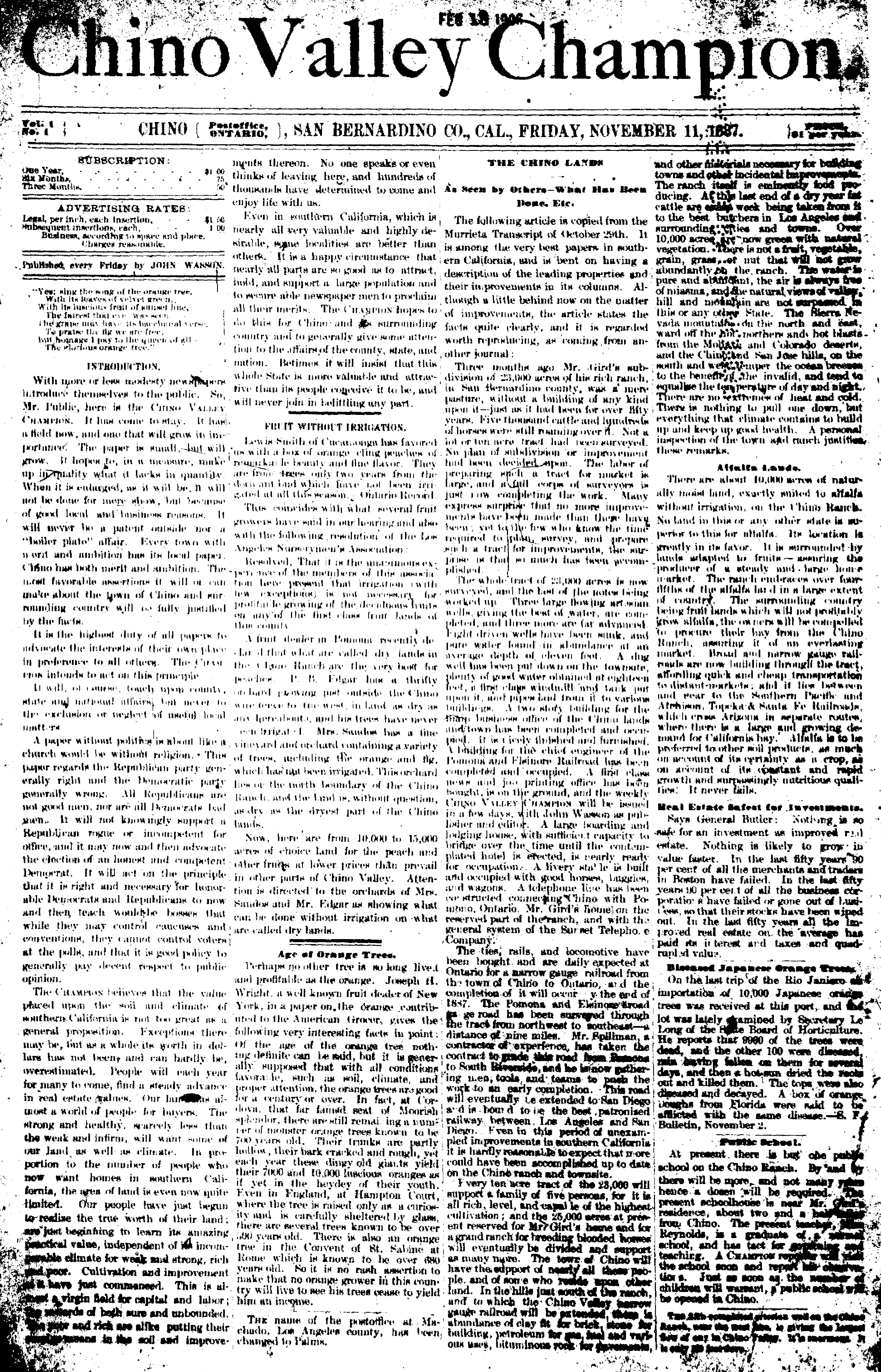
- Front page, first issue of the Chino Valley Champion, November 1, 1887
- Type: Weekly newspaper
- Format: Broadsheet
- Owner: William Fleet
- Founder: Richard Gird
- Publisher: William H. "Will" Fleet
- Editor: Brenda Dunkle
- Founded: November 11, 1887; 138 years ago
- Language: English
- Headquarters: 13179 Ninth Street; Chino, California 91710
- Circulation: 42,600
- Website: championnewspapers.com

The Chino Valley Champion is a weekly newspaper serving the Chino Valley area of Southern California. The paper publishes every Saturday morning and is zoned into Chino and Chino Hills editions.

== History ==
Richard Gird, the founder of Chino, also founded the Chino Valley Champion in 1887, as a "promotional sheet for the sale of the lands of the Chino rancho and to propagandize his newly established community. It was the first business in the new town. Everything that Gird purchased to put out the newspaper, its presses and its type, was bought "direct from the factory."

Although it was announced that "B.U. Mofflit, late of the Oakland Tribune, will have charge of the newspaper," John Wasson, a real estate agent in Pomona, was the first editor. The first issue of the Champion Valley Champion came off the press on November 11, 1887. The Los Angeles Herald wrote of the first issue that the newspaper was "already setting forth the merits of this delightful location" and later that the newspaper was a "well conducted, artistic little sheet."

Wasson left the paper in 1891 and bought a half interest in the Pomona Times. Edwin Rhodes succeeded his as proprietor. He edited the paper for 16 years and later became president of the First National and Chino Savings Bank. On the Champion's tenth birthday, Rhodes wrote: "It is a veritable fact that in the case of Chino a newspaper was started and the town built around it."

The Champion was purchased by Charles A. Gardner in 1906 (who dropped the word Valley from the masthead), John M. Reed in 1907, Ralph C. Homan in 1909, and Elmer L. Howell Sr. of Valentine, Nebraska in 1920. Three years later Howell was joined by his brother-in-law Charles H. Frady. His son R.E. "Bob" Frady became the business manager in 1925. Howell retired due to ill health and Bob Frady succeeded him in 1938. After his father died in 1943, Bob Frady was left as the paper's sole proprietor.

In July 1949, John S. Randolph Jr. and Joseph M. Kaukusch bought the paper. They sold it about six months later in January 1950, to Harry H. Hobart and his son William W. Hobart, of Wisconsin. In 1952, Richard "Dick" E. Blankenburg, former co-publisher of The Roseville Press Tribune, and E.V. Pederson of Grants Pass, Oregon, bought the Champion. At the time the paper's circulation was 1,600. In 1956, Allen P. McCombs, a graduate of Stanford University, bought the Champion from Blankenburg. The sale price was $65,000.

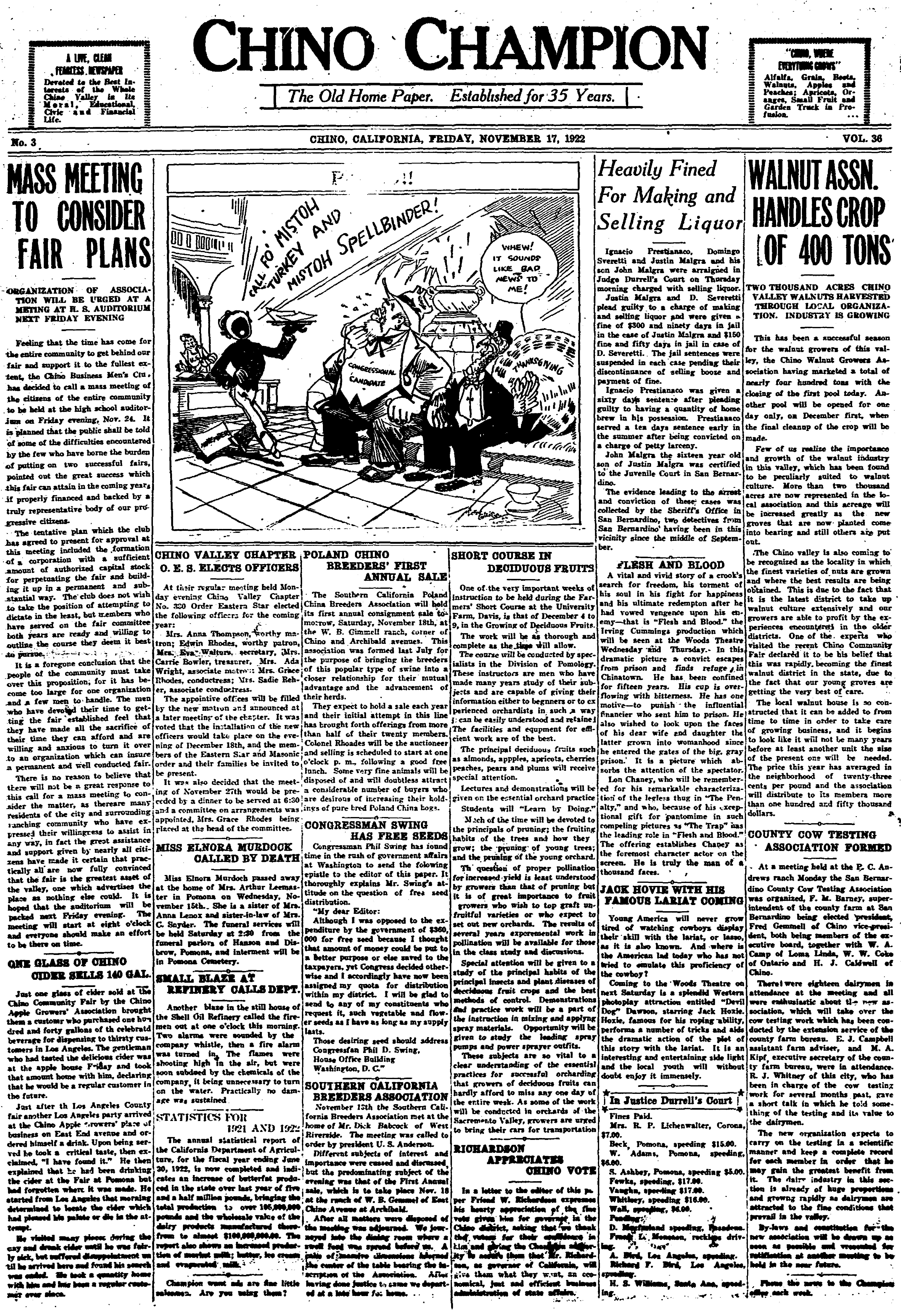
Front page of the Chino Champion, November 11, 1922, 35 years after its first issue

On May 18, 1971, two-thirds of the paper's office was destroyed in a fire caused by a Molotov cocktail. The damages were estimated at damage at $25,000. McCombs was at a school board meeting when the firebombing occurred. A local law office was also hit, but only $500 damage. McCombs and the attorney were both school board members and were discussing the expulsion of a student. McCombs suffered minor burns on his hand from opening a door and some historical documents were lost, but the paper's archive survived. The Champion continued to publish out of a temporary office.

In 1994, McCombs merged the paid edition of the Champion with the paper's freesheet called the Chino Valley News. The total circulation was 41,000. Bruce Wood took over as publisher in 2006 and McCombs operated the paper for 61 years. In 2017, he sold it to Will Fleet and Ralph Alldredge, owners of the Tracy Press. At that time the paid circulation was 2,000. In 2021, McCombs was posthumously inducted into the California Newspaper Hall of Fame. Alldredge, who also owned the Calaveras Enterprise, died in 2022.
