= The Mercury News =

Daily newspaper published in California

- The Newspaper of Silicon Valley

- The March 14, 2023, front page of The Mercury News
- Type: Daily newspaper
- Format: Broadsheet
- Owner: Digital First Media (Alden Global Capital)
- Founder: John C. Emerson et al.
- Publisher: Sharon Ryan
- Editor: Sarah Dussault
- Managing editor: Bryce Martin (content); Gabriel Sama (digital)
- News editor: Steve Palopoli; John Woolfolk; Daniel Jimenez
- Opinion editor: Max Taves
- Photo editor: Laura Oda
- Founded: June 20, 1851; 175 years ago (as San Jose Weekly Visitor)
- Language: English
- Headquarters: 75 E. Santa Clara Street, Suite 1100; San Jose, California 95113; U.S.
- Circulation: 24,200 Average print circulation 150,029 Sunday (as of 2023)
- ISSN: 0747-2099
- OCLC number: 145122249
- Website: mercurynews.com

The Mercury News (formerly San Jose Mercury News from 1983 to 2016; often locally known as The Merc) is a morning daily newspaper published in San Jose, California, in the San Francisco Bay Area. It is published by the Bay Area News Group, a subsidiary of Media News Group which in turn is controlled by Alden Global Capital, a vulture fund. In March 2013, it was the fifth largest daily newspaper in the United States, with a daily circulation of 611,194. In 2018, the paper had a circulation of 324,500 daily and 415,200 on Sundays. The Bay Area News Group no longer reports circulation, but rather "readership". As of 2021, readership of 312,700 adults daily was reported.

First published in 1851, the Mercury News is the last remaining English-language daily newspaper covering the Santa Clara Valley in Northern California. It became the Mercury News in 1983 after a series of mergers. During much of the 20th century, it was owned by Knight Ridder. Because of its location in Silicon Valley, the Mercury News has covered many of the key events in the history of information technology and computing, and was a pioneer in delivering news online. It was the first American newspaper to publish in three languages (English, Spanish, and Vietnamese).

== Name ==
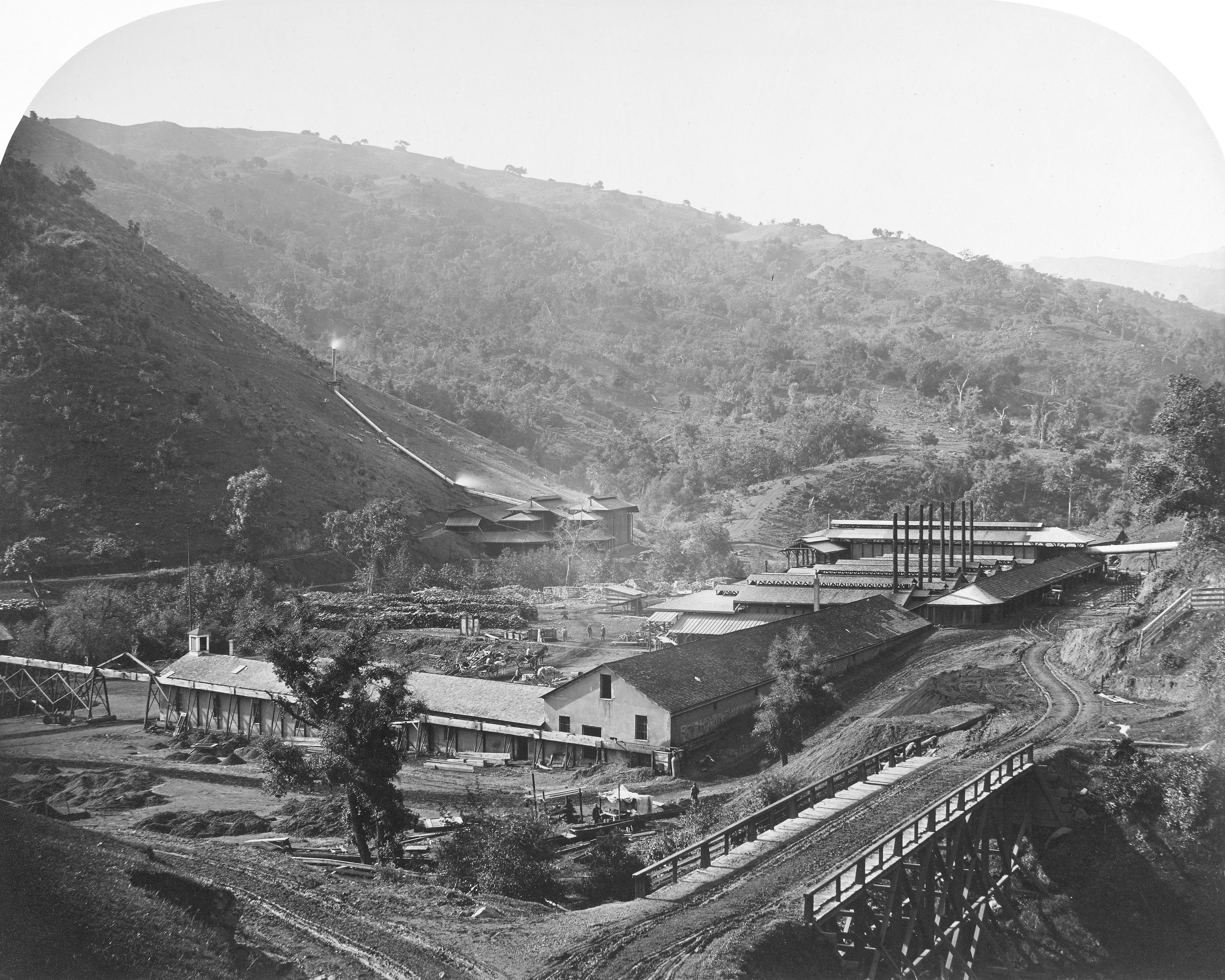
The New Almaden mercury mine near San Jose

The paper's name derives from the San Jose Mercury and San Jose News,, two daily newspapers that merged to form the Mercury News.

The San Jose Mercury's name was a play on words. The word "mercury" was often found in newspaper titles, but here it also alluded to the importance of the mercury industry during the California Gold Rush (1848–55) when the paper was first created (1851). At the time, the nearby New Almaden mine (now Almaden Quicksilver County Park) was North America's largest producer of mercury, which was needed for hydraulic gold mining. In addition, Mercury is the Roman messenger god as well as the god of commerce and thieves—he is known for his swiftness—so the name Mercury is commonly used for newspapers without the quicksilver association.

== Coverage ==
The paper's local coverage and circulation is concentrated in Santa Clara County and San Mateo County. With the Mercury News, East Bay Times, Marin Independent Journal, and Silicon Valley Community Newspapers, the Bay Area News Group covers much of the San Francisco Bay Area with the notable exception of San Francisco itself.

The Mercury News's predecessor, the Weekly Visitor, began as a Whig paper in the early 1850s but quickly switched its affiliation to the Democratic Party. The paper remained a conservative voice through the mid 20th century, when it supported pro-growth city leaders and pursued a staunchly pro-growth, anti-union agenda. It became considerably more moderate in the 1970s, reflecting new ownership and changes to the local political landscape. It endorsed John B. Anderson for president in 1980 and endorsed Democratic presidential candidates in every election from 1992 through 2016.

== History ==
=== Early history ===
The newspaper now known as the Mercury News began in 1851 or 1852. (Note: An issue from June 4, 1852, is numbered as volume 1, issue 1, but there an issue from February 20 earlier that year was numbered as issue 36.) California legislators had just moved the state capital from San Jose to Vallejo, leading to the failure of San Jose's first two newspapers, the Argus and State Journal. A group of three businessmen led by John C. Emerson bought the papers' presses to found the San Jose Weekly Visitor. The Weekly Visitor began as a Whig paper but quickly switched its affiliation to the Democratic Party. It was renamed the Santa Clara Register in 1852. The following year, Francis B. Murdoch took over the paper, merging it into the San Jose Telegraph. W. A. Slocum assumed control of the Telegraph in 1860 and merged it with the San Jose Mercury or Weekly Mercury to become the Telegraph and Mercury. William N. Slocum soon dropped Telegraph from the name. By this point, the Mercury was one of two newspapers publishing in San Jose.

=== Owen ownership ===
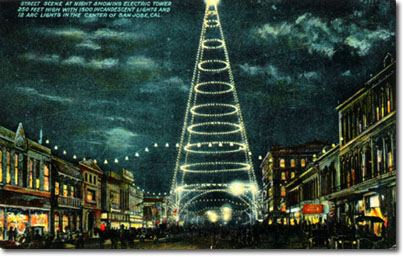
A postcard depicting the San Jose electric light tower

James Jerome Owen – a forty-niner and former Republican New York assemblyman – became the Mercury's publisher in the spring of 1861, later acquiring a controlling interest in the paper along with a partner, Benjamin H. Cottle. The paper published daily as the San Jose Daily Mercury for three months in the fall of 1861, then from August 1869 to April 1870 with the addition of J. J. Conmy as partner and again from March 11, 1872, after the purchase of the Daily Guide. In 1878, Owen formed the Mercury Printing and Publishing Company.

In 1881, Owen proposed to light San Jose with a moonlight tower. The San Jose electric light tower was dedicated that year. The Mercury boasted that San Jose was the first town west of the Rocky Mountains lighted by electricity.

The Mercury merged with the Times Publishing Company, which was owned by Charles M. Shortridge, in 1884. The Daily Morning Times and Daily Mercury briefly became the Times-Mercury, while the Weekly Times and Weekly Mercury briefly become the Times-Weekly Mercury. In 1885, both publications adopted the San Jose Mercury name. That year, Owen sold his interest in the paper and moved to San Francisco.

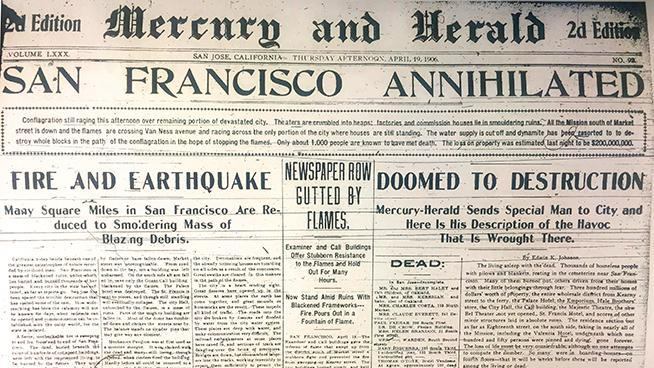
The Mercury and Herald front page on the afternoon of April 19, 1906, describes the state of destruction after the earthquake in San Francisco, including the destruction of the Examiner and Call buildings.

=== Hayes ownership ===
In late 1900, Everis A. Hayes and his brother Jay purchased the Mercury. In August 1901, they purchased the San Jose Daily Herald, an evening paper, and formed the Mercury Herald Company. In 1913, the two papers were consolidated into a single morning paper, the San Jose Mercury Herald.

In 1942, the Mercury Herald Company purchased the San Jose News (which was founded in 1851) but continued to publish both papers, the Mercury Herald in the morning and the News in the evening, with a combined Sunday edition called the Mercury Herald News. The Herald name was dropped in 1950.

=== Ridder ownership ===
Herman Ridder's Northwest Publications (later Ridder Publications) purchased the Mercury and News in 1952. During the mid 20th century, the papers took largely conservative, pro-growth positions. Publisher Joe Ridder was a vocal proponent of San Jose City Manager A. P. Hamann's development agenda, which emphasized urban sprawl within an ever-expanding city limits. Ridder counted on increasing population to lead to increased newspaper subscriptions and advertising sales. The paper supported a series of general obligation bonds worth $134 million (equivalent to $901 million in 2025), most of it spent on capital improvements that benefited real estate developers. It also supported a revision to the city charter that introduced a direct mayoral elections and abolished the vote of confidence for city manager. By 1967, the Mercury had risen to rank among the top six largest morning newspapers in the country by circulation, boosted by unabated growth into the suburbs, while the News ran the most advertising of any evening newspaper in the country.

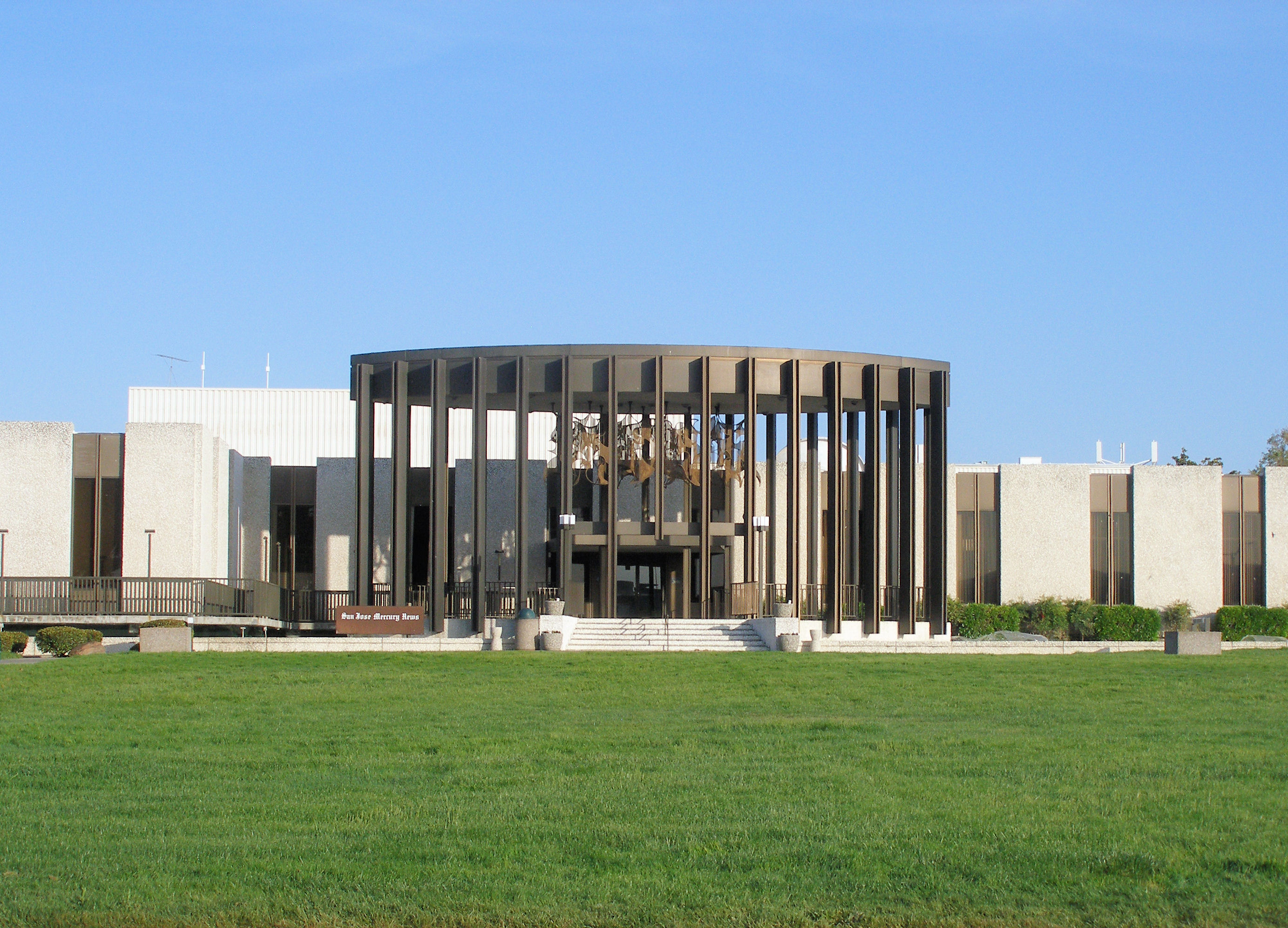
The Mercury News headquarters from 1967 to 2014 is now Supermicro Green Computing Park.

In February 1967, the Mercury and News moved from a cramped former grocery store in downtown San Jose to a 36-acre (15 ha) campus in suburban North San Jose. A 185,000-square-foot (17,200 m^{2}) main building could contain more presses to serve a booming population. The newly built complex cost $1 million (equivalent to $7.36 million in 2025) and was called the largest one-story newspaper plant in the world. Civic leaders criticized the move as emblematic of the urban decay that downtown San Jose was experiencing.

=== Knight Ridder ownership ===
In 1974, Ridder merged with Knight Newspapers to form Knight Ridder. Joe Ridder was forced to retire in 1977. His nephew, P. Anthony "Tony" Ridder, succeeded him as publisher. Tony Ridder placed an emphasis on improving the papers' reportage, to better reflect Knight's reputation for investigative journalism.

After the merger, the papers moderated their formerly staunch pro-growth agenda, and coverage of local issues became more balanced. The editorial board expressed only minimal opposition to a 1978 measure that abolished at-large city council elections, seen as favorable to deep-pocketed developers, in favor of council districts. It supported the desegregation of San Jose Unified School District and in 1978 argued against Proposition 13. In the 1980s, Ridder supported Mayor Tom McEnery's efforts to redevelop the downtown area, including the construction of San Jose Arena and The Tech Museum of Innovation.

Logo of the San Jose Mercury News from 1983 to 2016

In 1983, the Mercury and News merged into a single seven-day paper, the San Jose Mercury News, with separate morning and afternoon editions. The afternoon edition was discontinued in 1995, leaving only the morning edition.

In the 1980s and 1990s, the Mercury News published West magazine as a Sunday insert.

==== Coverage of ethnic communities ====
In the 1990s, the Mercury News expanded its coverage of the area's ethnic communities, to national acclaim, hiring Vietnamese-speaking reporters for the first time. In 1994, it became the first of two American dailies to open a foreign bureau in Vietnam after the Vietnam War. A foreign correspondent stationed at the Hanoi bureau held an annual town hall meeting with the Vietnamese-American community in San Jose. Initially, community members staged protests accusing the paper of siding with the Communist government in Vietnam by opening the bureau.

Logo of Viet Mercury from 1999 to 2005

The Mercury News launched the free, Spanish-language weekly Nuevo Mundo (New World) in 1996 and the free, Vietnamese-language weekly Viet Mercury in 1999. Viet Mercury was the first Vietnamese-language newspaper published by an English-language daily. It competed against a crowded field of 14 Vietnamese-owned community newspapers, including four dailies.

==== Growth alongside the technology industry ====
The Mercury News benefited from its status as the major daily newspaper in Silicon Valley during the dot-com bubble. It led the news industry in business coverage of the valley's high-tech industry, attracting readers from around the world. Time called the Mercury News the most technologically savvy newspaper in the country. The tech industry's growth fueled growth in the paper's classified advertising, particularly for employment listings. For 20 years, the Mercury News was one of the country's top newspapers in the amount of advertising it ran.

The Mercury News was one of the first daily newspapers in the United States to have an online presence, and was the first to deliver full content and breaking news online. It launched a service called Mercury Center on America Online in 1993, followed by the country's first news website in 1995 (see § Online presence). Mercury Center shut down its AOL service in July 1996, leaving only the website.

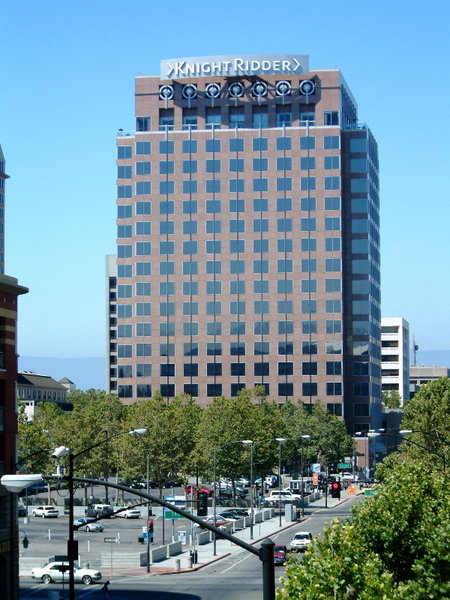
The Mercury News's parent company was headquartered at the Knight-Ridder Building in downtown San Jose from 1998 to 2006.

At its peak in 2001, the Mercury News had 400 employees in its newsroom, 15 bureaus, $288 million in annual revenue, and profit margins above 30%. In 1998, Knight Ridder moved its headquarters from Miami to the Knight-Ridder Building in San Jose, which was seen as an acknowledgment of the central role that online news would play in the company's future. Mercury Center ended its paywall in May 1998, after posting 1.2 million monthly unique visitors the previous year. By 2000, the paper had a Sunday circulation of 327,000 and $341 million in annual revenue, $118 million of it from job listings. In 2001, circulation rose to 289,413 daily and 332,669 Sundays.

==== Flush times come to an end ====
The collapse of the dot-com bubble impacted the classified advertising that sustained the newspaper's business operations. Additionally, newspapers across the industry faced serious competition to their job listings from websites such as Monster.com, CareerBuilder, and Craigslist.

Cost-cutting began affecting the initiatives the paper had started in the 1990s. In June 2005, the Mercury News closed its Hanoi bureau. On October 21, it also announced the closure of Nuevo Mundo and the sale of Viet Mercury to a group of Vietnamese-American businessmen; however, the deal fell through, and Viet Mercury published its final issue on November 11, 2005.

=== Digital First ownership ===
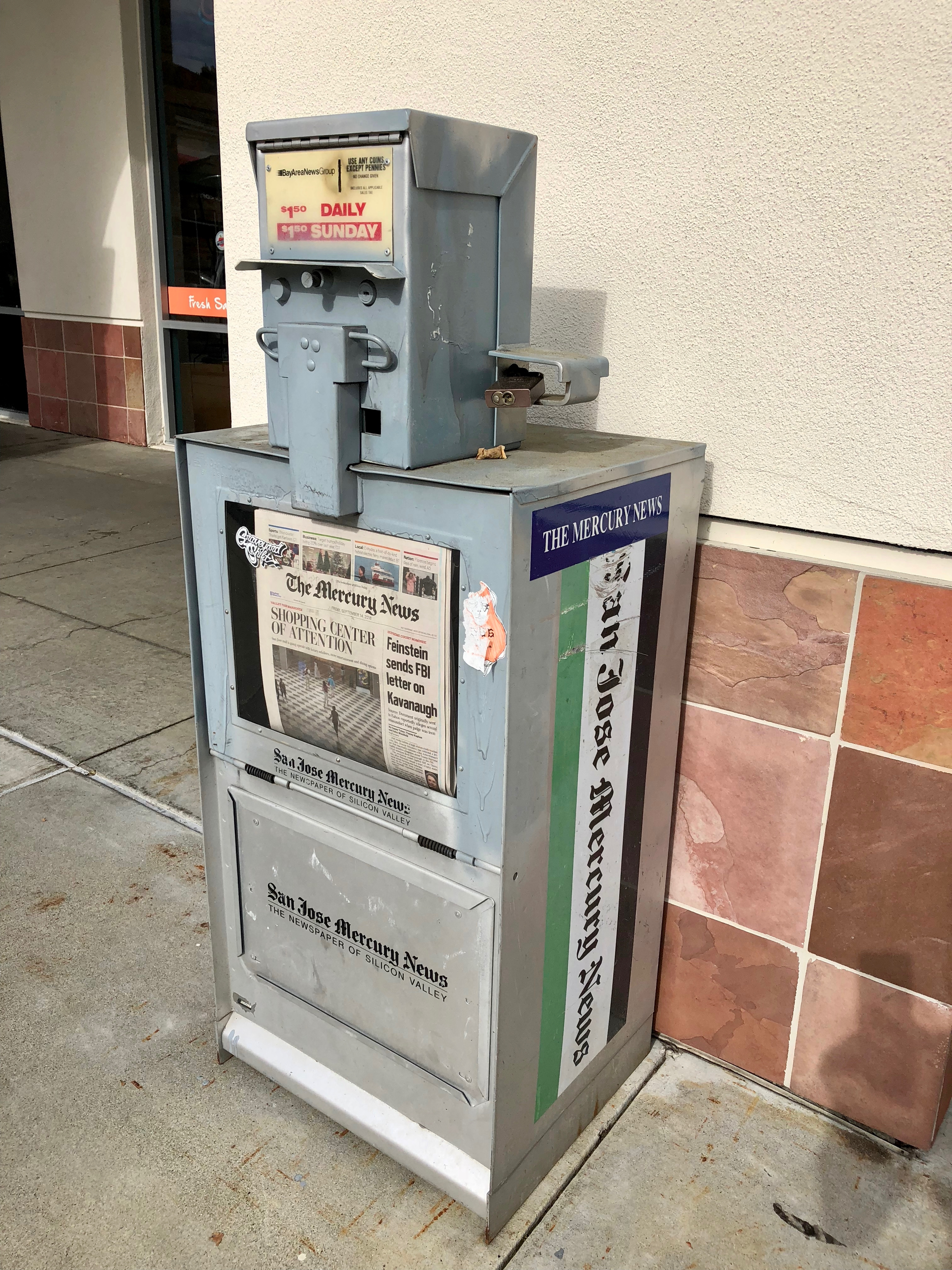
"The Mercury News" stickers have been affixed to San Jose Mercury News vending machines.

On March 13, 2006, The McClatchy Company purchased Knight Ridder for $4.5 billion. In a surprise move, McClatchy immediately put the Mercury News and 11 other newspapers back up for sale. On April 26, Denver-based MediaNews Group (now Digital First Media) announced a planned $1 billion purchase of the Mercury News, two other California newspapers, and the St. Paul Pioneer Press, with the three California papers to be added to the California Newspapers Partnership (CNP). However, on June 12, 2006, federal regulators from the U.S. Department of Justice asked for more time to review the purchase, citing possible antitrust concerns over MediaNews' ownership of other newspapers in the region.

Although approval by regulators and completion of MediaNews' acquisition was announced on August 2, 2006, a lawsuit claiming antitrust violations by MediaNews and the Hearst Corporation had also been filed in July 2006. The suit, which sought to undo the purchase of both the Mercury News and the Contra Costa Times, was scheduled to go to trial on April 30, 2007. While extending until that date a preliminary injunction that prevented the collaboration of local distribution and national advertising sales by the two media conglomerates, U.S. District Judge Susan Illston on December 19, 2006, expressed doubt over the legality of the purchase. On April 25, 2007, days before the trial was scheduled to begin, the parties reached a settlement in which MediaNews preserved its acquisitions. The Mercury News and Contra Costa Times were placed under CNP's local subsidiary, the Bay Area News Group. Meanwhile, layoffs continued at the Mercury News. Around December 2016, 101 employees were laid off, including 40 in the newsroom.

In 2013, MediaNews Group and 21st Century Media merged to form Digital First Media. In April 2013, MediaNews announced that it would sell the Mercury News campus on Ridder Park Drive in North San Jose. County Supervisor Dave Cortese approached the Mercury News about moving into the former San Jose City Hall on North First Street, but the paper ended up returning downtown. In June 2014, printing and production of the Mercury News and other daily newspapers moved to Bay Area News Group's Concord and Hayward facilities. The Mercury News moved into a downtown office building that September. According to the publishers, the Ridder Park Drive facility had become unnecessarily large for the paper, following the departure of printing operations and other staff reductions that had occurred over the years.

On April 5, 2016, Bay Area News Group consolidated the San Mateo County Times and 14 other titles into the San Jose Mercury News. The paper's name was shortened to The Mercury News.

== Facilities ==
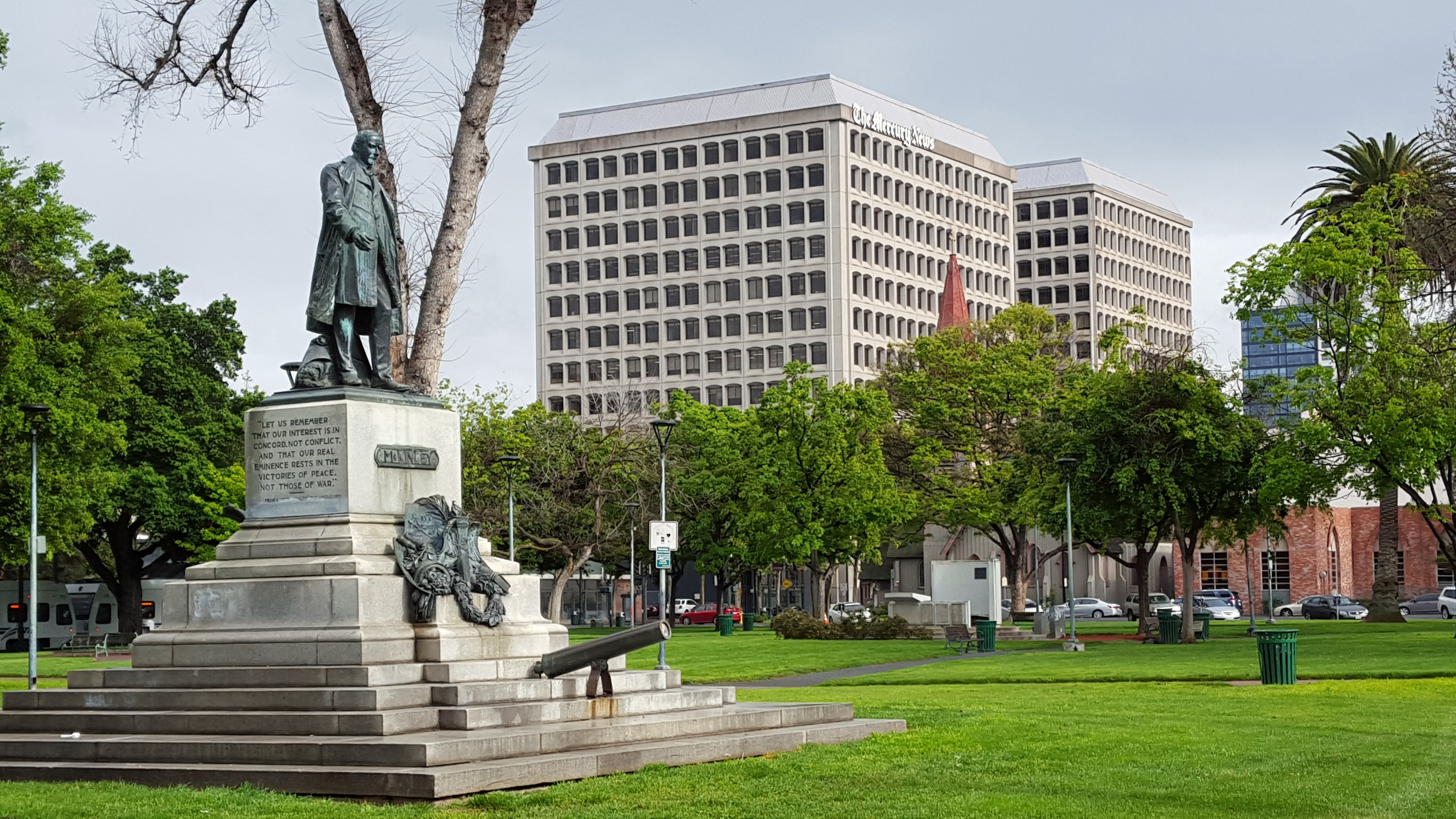
The Mercury News headquarters in downtown San Jose

The Mercury News is the largest tenant in the Towers at 2nd high-rise office complex in downtown San Jose. Business functions occupy the seventh floor of 4 North Second Street, while news staff and executives occupy the eighth floor, for a total of 33,186 square feet (3,083.1 m^{2}). Printing and production of the Mercury News take place at the Bay Area News Group's facilities in Concord and Hayward in the East Bay.

Originally, the Mercury and News published from various locations in downtown San Jose. From February 1967 to September 2014, the papers were headquartered in a 36-acre (15 ha) campus in suburban North San Jose, abutting the Nimitz Freeway (then State Route 17, now Interstate 880). The Web staff was originally co-located with the newsroom staff but moved to downtown San Jose in December 1996. Following the Mercury News' return to the downtown area, Digital First Media sold the suburban campus to Super Micro Computer, Inc., which renamed it "Supermicro Green Computing Park".

Older San Jose Mercury News newsboxes have black, white, and green stripes, while newer Mercury News newsboxes bear the paper's logo in white against a blue background.

== Online presence ==
The Mercury News operates a paywalled website, which is located at mercurynews.com, sjmercury.com, or sjmn.com. Its SiliconValley.com website focuses on the technology industry in Silicon Valley. It also publishes a morning e-mail newsletter, Good Morning Silicon Valley, that covers technology news. "Mercury News" and "e-Edition" applications are available for Android and iOS devices, as well as for the Kindle Fire and Barnes & Noble Nook.

The original Mercury Center service on America Online. Despite the popularity of premium features such as the "News Library", Mercury Center gave more prominence to content from the print paper, such as news and sports headlines.

The Mercury News was one of the first daily newspapers in the United States to have an online presence and was the first to deliver full content and breaking news online. In 1990, editor Robert Ingle sent a report to Tony Ridder, then the head of Knight Ridder, on the company's future in electronic media after the failure of Viewtron four years earlier. Ingle proposed a Mercury Center online service that would use the newspaper's content to bring together communities of interest. It launched as part of America Online on May 10, 1993, at AOL keyword MERCURY. It was the second news service on AOL, after the Chicago Tribune opened Chicago Online in 1992.

The paper sent floppy disks to subscribers for accessing Mercury Center. The service featured a large amount of content for free: the print paper's full content, supplementary material such as documents and audio clips, stock quotes, and about 200 stories that did not make the print edition. A forum enabled readers to converse with each other and give feedback to reporters. However, the service's most popular content lie behind a paywall: back issues from 1985 onward and a "NewsHound" clipping service were popular with business users. Readers could enter alphanumeric codes, which appeared throughout the print paper, to quickly access online versions of articles that did not make print. Examples included N620 for an article in the news section or B770 for a press release in the business section. The Mercury Center staff comprised both news reporters and business "senders", who posted press releases online in addition to vetted content.

Initially, the service had difficulty attracting users, prompting the paper to add a telephone and fax hotline, News Call, in November 1993. By early 1994, Mercury Center had added 5,100 subscribers to AOL, representing less than 20% of AOL's 30,000 subscribers in the San Francisco Bay Area or less than two percent of the Mercury News's 282,488 daily subscribers.

In December 1994, the Mercury News began beta-testing a companion website, Mercury Center Web, which on January 20, 1995, became the country's first news website. Subscribers no longer needed AOL to access the Mercury News's online content, and the paper no longer had to share advertising revenue with AOL. The site ran on Netscape's Netsuite Web server, with connectivity provided by Netcom. Access to the site cost $4.95 per month, with a discount for print subscribers. In October 1995, CareerBuilder.com launched as a partnership between the Boston Globe, Chicago Tribune, Los Angeles Times, Mercury News, New York Times, and Washington Post. Mercury Center shut down its AOL service in July 1996, leaving only the website.

In August 1996, the Mercury News published "Dark Alliance", a series of investigative articles by reporter Gary Webb that claimed CIA involvement in Contra cocaine trafficking (see § Controversies). The Mercury News promoted the upcoming series on Usenet newsgroups weeks in advance. Mercury Center published reporting and supporting material online simultaneously with the print edition. The robust online production drew significant national attention to the series. Within days, more than 2,500 websites linked to Mercury Center's "Dark Alliance" section, and the site received 100,000 daily page views over the usual traffic for weeks. Executive editor Jerome Ceppos eventually distanced the paper from the series, but it continued to receive attention, especially from online conspiracy theorists.

On October 26, 1999, technology columnist Dan Gillmor began writing a blog, eJournal, on the Mercury News' SiliconValley.com website. It is believed to have been the first blog by a journalist at a traditional media company. In the 2000s, he was joined by columnists-turned-bloggers Tim Kawakami and John Paczkowski.

Articles dating back to June 1985 can be found online for free on the Mercury News website, with full text available on the NewsLibrary and NewsBank subscription databases. NewsBank also hosts the full text of articles from 1886 to 1922. The San José Public Library's website hosts thousands of news clips of articles from 1920 to 1979. Much of Gillmor's eJournal is preserved on the Bayosphere website.

== Awards ==
The newspaper has earned several awards, including two Pulitzer Prizes, one in 1986 for reporting regarding political corruption in the Ferdinand Marcos administration in the Philippines, and one in 1990 for their comprehensive coverage of the 1989 Loma Prieta earthquake. Assistant managing editor David Yarnold was also a Pulitzer Prize finalist in 2004 for a local corruption investigation. The Mercury News was also named one of the five best-designed newspapers in the world by the Society for News Design for work done in 2001. In 2007 the newspaper won a Missouri Lifestyle Journalism Award for General Excellence, Class IV.

Various staff writers and designers have received awards for their contributions to West magazine, a Sunday insert published by the Mercury News in the 1980s and 1990s.

The Mercury News website received EPpy Awards in 1996, 1999, 2009, 2013, and 2014.

== Controversies ==
In August 1996, the Mercury News published "Dark Alliance", a series of investigative articles by reporter Gary Webb. The series claimed that members of the Nicaraguan Contras, a right wing guerrilla group organized with the help of the Central Intelligence Agency, had been involved in smuggling cocaine into America to support their struggle, and as a result, had played a major role in creating the crack-cocaine epidemic of the 1980s. The series sparked three federal investigations, but other newspapers such as the Los Angeles Times later published articles alleging that the series' claims were overstated. Executive editor Jerry Ceppos, who had approved the series, eventually published a column that suggested shortcomings in the series' reporting, editing, and production, while maintaining the story was correct "on many important points". The series was turned into a 1998 book by the same name, also by Webb, and an account of the controversy surrounding the series was published as Kill the Messenger in 2006. Both were the basis for the 2014 film Kill the Messenger.

== Notable people ==
- Lamberto Alvarez – artist
- Scott Apel – Mercury News movie columnist; science fiction writer
- Dwight Bentel – Mercury Herald reporter
- Ryan Blitstein – Mercury News business reporter; nonprofit executive
- Howard Bryant – technology and sports reporter
- Ric Bucher – Mercury News beat writer; radio basketball analyst
- Stephen Butler – financial columnist
- Lou Cannon – reporter
- John Canzano – sports columnist
- Pete Carey – Pulitzer Prize–winning reporter
- Denis Collins – reporter
- Tim Cowlishaw – sportswriter
- Penny De Los Santos – photographer
- Diana Diamond – editorial writer
- Hannah Dreier – reporter
- Sandra Eisert – Pulitzer Prize–winning photographer and West art director
- Katherine Ellison – Pulitzer Prize–winning reporter
- Steve Fainaru – investigative reporter
- Dan Gillmor – technology columnist and blogger
- Susan Goldberg – Mercury News managing editor; magazine editor
- Pedro Gomez – baseball writer
- Minal Hajratwala – Mercury News journalist; writer and queer rights activist
- Jay T. Harris – Mercury News chairman and publisher
- Everis A. Hayes – Mercury Herald publisher and proprietor; Republican congressman from California
- David E. Hoffman – reporter
- David Cay Johnston – reporter
- Tim Kawakami – sports columnist
- Jeffrey Bruce Klein – West editor-in-chief; investigative reporter
- Robert Lindsey – Mercury News reporter; crime author
- Steve Lopez – staff writer
- Michael S. Malone – technology reporter
- Gerald Nachman – Mercury television reviewer
- Hoang Xuan Nguyen – Viet Mercury managing editor; South Vietnamese author
- James Jerome Owen – Mercury publisher; Republican New York assemblyman and California assemblyman
- Sal Pizarro – Around Town, Cocktail Chronicles columnist
- Michael Rezendes – reporter
- James Herbert (Bert) Robinson – Pulitzer Prize-winning Senior Editor
- Lewis M. Simons – Pulitzer Prize-winning reporter
- Susan Slusser – baseball writer
- Rebecca Smith – reporter
- Timothy Taylor – opinion columnist
- Philip Trounstine – political writer and editor
- Gary Webb – investigative reporter
- Leigh Weimers – Community columnist
- Troy Wolverton – technology columnist
- David Yarnold – Mercury News senior vice president; environmentalist

== Community weeklies ==
The Mercury News publishes the following community weeklies:

- Almaden Resident
- Cambrian Resident
- Campbell Reporter
- Cupertino Courier
- Los Gatos Weekly
- Rose Garden Resident
- Saratoga News
- Sunnyvale Sun
- Willow Glen Resident
- Peninsula News
- The Milpitas Post

== See also ==
- List of newspapers in California
- San Jose Mercury News West Magazine
- Viet Mercury
