= Hal Plotkin =

American journalist

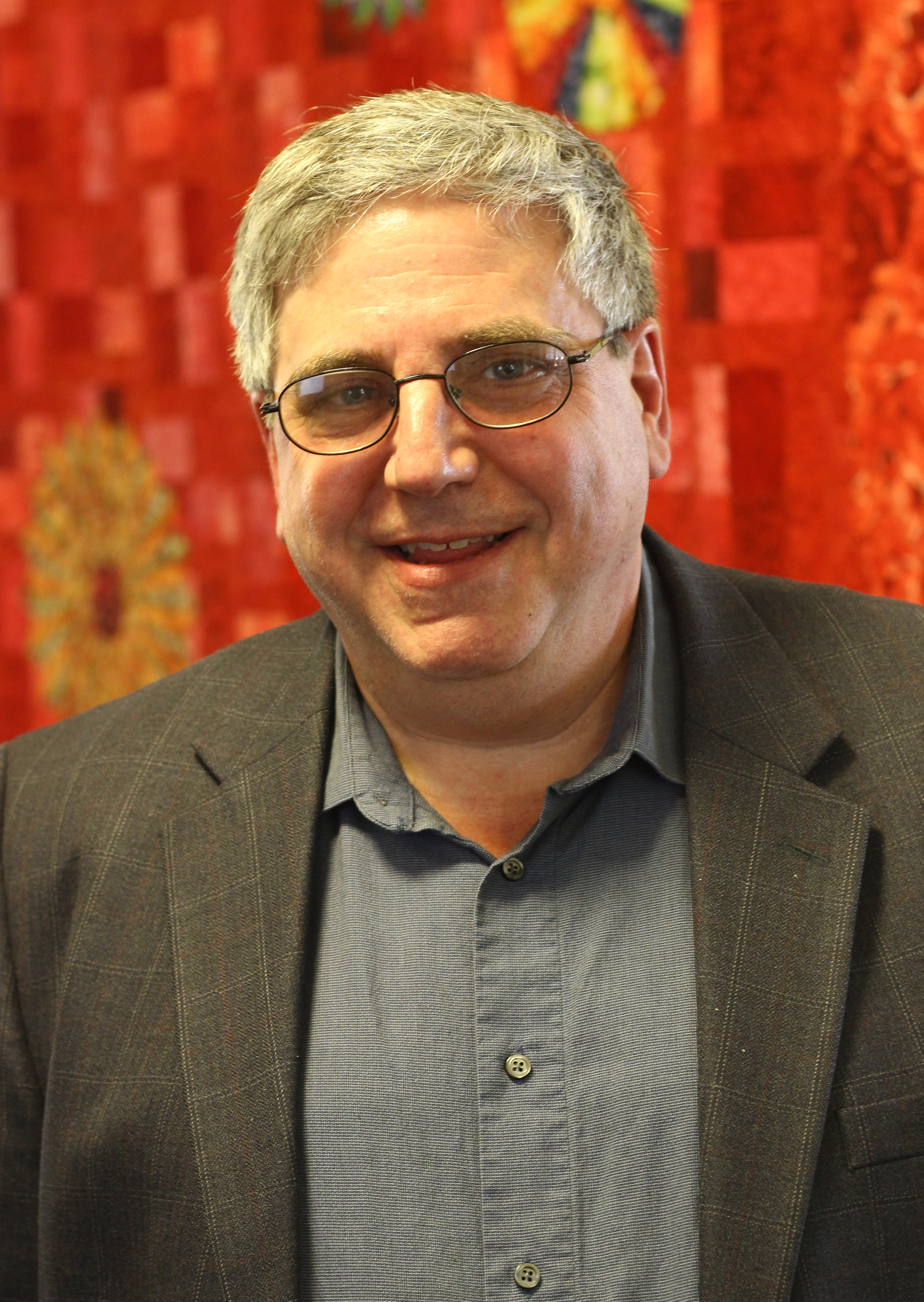
- Hal Plotkin at the Institute for Open Leadership in 2015

Senior Policy Advisor Office of the Under Secretary of Education
- In office July 2009 – August 2014

Personal details
- Born: Hal Wayne Plotkin; September 14, 1957 (age 69) New York City, U.S.
- Spouse: Loren A. Stein (m. 1999; died 2020)
- Children: 1
- Education: Foothill College (A.A.); San Jose State University (B.A.)

Hal Wayne Plotkin (born September 14, 1957) is an American journalist and activist. He is currently the senior open policy fellow at Creative Commons.

From 2009 to 2014, Plotkin served as the Senior Policy Advisor in the Office of the Under Secretary of Education, United States Department of Education, which has responsibility for all federal U.S. higher education policies and programs.

In 2003, Plotkin initiated the Foothill-De Anza Community College District's Policy on Public Domain Learning Materials which are now more commonly known as Open Educational Resources.

== Early life ==
Plotkin attended Palo Alto High School, where he was an editor for the student newspaper, The Campanile. Family circumstances led him to drop out of high school during his junior year in order to work full-time in whatever jobs he could find, including gas station bathroom cleaner and pizza maker. Plotkin managed to graduate with his high school class in 1975 after administrators gave him course credit for some of his employment activities.

He attended college part-time over the next 10 years while working a variety of jobs, including as a Comprehensive Employment and Training Act worker serving as an aide to then-Santa Clara County Supervisor Rod Diridon, Sr. In 1979, Plotkin began working as a researcher, writer, editor and broadcaster. His earliest journalism jobs included serving as news and public affairs director for KPEN 97.7 FM and writing for the San Jose Metro alternative newspaper. Plotkin eventually earned his Associate of Arts degree in history from Foothill College in 1985 and his Bachelor of Arts degree in behavioral sciences, with distinction, at San Jose State University in 1986. He also ghostwrote two books and served as an editorial consultant on several others during this period.

== Professional career ==
Plotkin worked as a Silicon Valley–based journalist and commentator, with his work often focused on technology, business, public policy, education and science. He was a founding editor of American Public Media's Marketplace program and a former columnist for CNBC.com and SFGate.com, the website of the San Francisco Chronicle. He joined CNBC.com the following year as full-time Silicon Valley correspondent for the online operations of the financial news television network. He worked for CNBC.com from the day the site went online in July 1999 until Microsoft Corp. took over editorial operations in July 2001.

Plotkin has written more than 650 articles for a wide variety of publishers, including Barron's, Inc., Forbes ASAP, Harvard Business Publishing, California Business, Metro, Family Business and International Business magazines. Plotkin's articles and essays include "Riches From Rags," one of the first printed references to the term "mass customization;" "Tear Down the Walls," which made an early case for what has become the Open Educational Resources movement, a description of the new "higher education ecosystem" made possible by the Internet; the first article about Creative Commons, and a variety of articles for Harvard Business School Press.

In 1988, Plotkin's investigative reports on potential media influence buying by Pentagon contractors associated with misleading, unnecessary, and expensive full-page daily newspaper classified help wanted ads led to a congressional investigation, and an audit by the Department of Defense Contracting Audit Agency that illuminated opportunities for hundreds of millions of dollars in annual savings. Plotkin received a letter of commendation for his work from David Packard, founder of Hewlett-Packard, and a former Deputy Secretary of Defense.

In 1996, Plotkin wrote one of the first articles on Yahoo!, based on interviews he conducted with the founders while they were seeking initial investors, and which was published shortly before the company went public. He also wrote an early article about Confinity, which was later renamed PayPal.

Plotkin is also the founder, chairman of the board, and former CEO of the Center for Media Change, a Palo Alto–based non-profit organization that facilitates the creation, development and use of new business models to preserve the economic and professional viability of high-quality independent fact-based journalism. Plotkin was the founding editor of the Center for Media Change's first project, www.ReelChanges.org, which launched on May 1, 2008. ReelChanges was the first online site to pioneer crowdfunding of high-quality documentary film projects. ReelChanges won a small grant from the Corporation for Public Broadcasting's Media Innovation Fund but was unable to attract additional financial support. Despite generating considerable buzz ReelChanges went offline in March 2009, when Plotkin accepted a position in the Obama administration.

The Center for Media Change, Inc. also served as the parent 501(C)3 non-profit for a similar site, spot.us, founded by David Cohn. Spot.us was acquired by American Public Media in early 2012.

In recent years, Plotkin has devoted much of his time to advancing the Open Educational Resources movement.

== Activism ==
In 1992, Plotkin filed a class-action lawsuit against General Electric Company in connection with the misleading packaging of incandescent light bulbs. The settlement of Plotkin vs. General Electric and a related agreement between the company and the Federal Trade Commission raised public awareness about the growing practice of "greenwashing" and led to a settlement in which G.E. made customer refunds and financial contributions to environmental groups in the amount of $3.25 million. Plotkin received no funds from the 1993 settlement.

== Politics ==
In 1980, Plotkin, aged 22, ran in a four-way race for the Santa Clara County Board of Supervisors Fifth District against Thomas Ferri, James E. Jackson, and Rebecca Morgan. Plotkin campaigned to bring attention to incarcerated youth, in addition to favoring a solar water heater ordinance and an ordinance on the ballot that year prohibiting discrimination based on sexual orientation. Plotkin was defeated, receiving 9.7% of the vote-share.

In 1993, Plotkin won the Democratic party's nomination for a special election to fill Silicon Valley's seat in the California state Senate but was defeated in the general election by Tom Campbell, a former GOP member of the U.S. Congress. The following year, he was appointed to serve a two-year term on the California state Economic Strategy Panel by the then-Speaker of the California state Assembly, Willie Brown, Jr.

In 1994, Plotkin served as a senior fellow of the World Economic Development Congress, where he helped organize a conference that brought PLO leader Yasser Arafat and then Israeli-president Chaim Herzog together for peace and economic cooperation talks in Madrid.

While working for the United States Department of Education, Plotkin worked to advance the use of Open Educational Resources to increase access to high-quality educational opportunities and improve the quality of teaching and learning while lowering costs imposed on students, communities and schools.

== Awards ==
In 2006, Plotkin was the recipient of the San Francisco Bay Area Jewish Family and Children's Services FAMMY award. In 2016, Plotkin was inducted into the United States Distance Learning Association (USDLA) prestigious Hall of Fame. Individuals inducted into the Hall of Fame "have contributed significantly to the field of distance learning through leadership, technology, research, teaching and actively support the mission of USDLA."
