= Saratoga News =

- Type: Weekly newspaper
- Owner: Digital First Media
- Founder(s): Sherman and Wilma M. Miller
- Publisher: Bay Area News Group
- Founded: 1955
- Circulation: 13,240
- ISSN: 0745-6255
- OCLC number: 9314253
- Website: www.mercurynews.com/saratoga

The Saratoga News is a local paper covering the city of Saratoga, California, in Santa Clara county. Published weekly on Tuesday, it has an estimated circulation of 13,240.

== Ownership and history ==
The Saratoga News was founded in 1955 by Sherman and Wilma M. Miller.

The paper was sold in 1973 to Suburban Newspaper Publishers Association group in Cupertino, headed by Mort Levine. It was sold again to the Meredith Corporation in 1978, then to ex-Meredith executive Terrence T. Donnelly and later to the Peninsula Times Tribune subsidiary of Tribune Publishing.

In 1990, Metro Newspapers purchased the Saratoga News along with Los Gatos Times-Observer and Los Gatos Weekly, the latter of which had been founded by Metro CEO Dan Pulcrano in 1982. Under Metro, the Saratoga News enjoyed a decade-long run, its longest period of local ownership other than that of the Millers. The community newspaper group adopted the name Silicon Valley Community Newspapers and purchased or started weeklies in Cupertino, Sunnyvale, Campbell and the Willow Glen district of San Jose. In 2001, Metro executive David Cohen purchased the Saratoga News as part of a management buyout of the community newspaper group.

In 2005, Knight Ridder purchased the Saratoga News as part of its acquisition of the Silicon Valley Community Newspapers. In 2006, Knight Ridder was purchased by McClatchy Co., which immediately sold SVCN and the San Jose Mercury News to MediaNews Group. MediaNews Group is now known as Digital First Media. Silicon Valley Community Newspapers and the Saratoga News are published as part of the San Jose Mercury News. As part of its merger with San Jose Mercury News, Saratoga News is offered as part of a subscription model, rather than as a free weekly paper.

The paper is currently published by the Bay Area News Group, which is owned by Digital First Media.
