= Tri-City Voice =

- Type: Weekly newspaper
- Owner(s): Weeklys
- Publisher: William Marshak
- Founded: 2002
- Headquarters: Fremont, California, United States
- OCLC number: 49056272
- Website: tricityvoice.com

The Tri-City Voice is a weekly San Francisco Bay Area newspaper based in Fremont, California, and covering the cities of Fremont, Newark, Union City, Hayward, Milpitas and Sunol.

== History ==
It was founded in 2002, and went online at tricityvoice.com in 2004.

The paper covers local news, arts, history, and entertainment. It is designated a newspaper of general circulation by the cities of Fremont and Union City. Print copies are made available primarily through free distribution, as well as paid subscriptions.

The Tri-City Voice is owned by What's Happening, Inc. Founding publisher and editor William Marshak retired in June 2024, announcing, “Father Time has given us clear signals to spend more time with family, especially our new great-granddaughters.”

== Recognition ==
The paper was given the 2018 "Media of the Year" award by the Indo-American Community Federation, and is one of 72 American newspapers being archived by the Princeton University Library for its coverage on African American communities.
