= NewsLibrary =

Online news database

NewsLibrary is an online news database operated by NewsBank that houses a conglomeration of news from over "4,000 outlets in the United States", most of which are "traditional" sources of news coverage, such as "newspapers and television stations". A total of over 7,700 different newspapers are included in the article database. The database itself allows a user to input a search term and then narrow the listed search by date, region and newspaper, with the earliest possible articles to find being from the early 1980s. The site charges a fee for viewing the content, which is done on a pay-per-article scale, with each article costing $2.95. The cost of viewing articles is charged to an individual's account on a monthly basis, and there are also membership options, either 25 articles a month ($19.95) or 500 articles a year ($199.95).

Originally developed by Knight Ridder, it is described as a successor to the web archive VU/TEXT that was owned by Knight Ridder and shut down in 1996. NewsLibrary was purchased by NewsBank in 2001.

NewsLibrary differs from other news databases in that the site allows the user to input a date, region, and newspaper, but nothing in the search bar; this brings up all of the articles published within the narrowed selection string, rather than searching for the use of a term or phrase within an article.
