= North Bay Bohemian =

Weekly newspaper in California, US

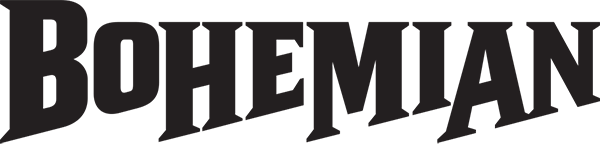

- The front page of the October 17, 2007 edition of the North Bay Bohemian
- Type: Alternative weekly
- Format: Tabloid : Compact (newspaper)
- Owner: Weeklys
- Publisher: Rosemary Olson
- President: Dan Pulcrano
- Editor: Daedalus Howell
- Founded: 1979
- Headquarters: 445 Center St Ste 4 Healdsburg, California 95448; United States
- Circulation: 29,925 (as of 2008)
- Sister newspapers: Pacific Sun, Healdsburg Tribune, Good Times Santa Cruz, Metro Silicon Valley, East Bay Express
- ISSN: 1532-0154
- Website: Bohemian.com

The North Bay Bohemian is a weekly newspaper published in the North Bay subregion of the San Francisco Bay Area, in California, United States. The newspaper is distributed in Sonoma and Napa counties.

== History ==
The newspaper began publication in 1979 as The Paper in the Guerneville area of western Sonoma County by artist turned community journalist Nick Valentine and jazz pianist Bob Lucas. Elizabeth Poole bought the struggling publication with family money shortly after its 1979 debut and owned it until its 1990 purchase by John Boland and James Carroll.

The Paper was renamed the Sonoma County Independent in 1993 and published every other week under Boland and Carroll, who moved its offices to Santa Rosa. In 1994 the Independent was purchased by Weeklys, an independent group of three Bay Area alternative weeklies, and the publication frequency was changed to weekly.

In 2000, the newspaper was rebranded as the North Bay Bohemian and the circulation area was expanded to Marin and Napa counties. In 2015, Weeklys acquired the Pacific Sun, which covered Marin County, and the Bohemian withdrew from Marin County.

In September 2018, Stett Holbrook resigned as the publication's editor-in-chief. In fall of 2019, longtime contributor Daedalus Howell became the editor.

== Logo ==
The Bohemian's logo was originally designed by graphic designer Martin Venezky and later refined by typographer Jim Parkinson. It was based on the 19th Century wedge serif typeface Saracen as redrawn by Jonathan Hoefler.
