= Dan Pulcrano =

American journalist

Dan Pulcrano (born c. 1959) is a journalist, editor, publisher, and newspaper group owner in Northern California. He is CEO and executive editor of Metro Silicon Valley, Silicon Valley's alternative newsweekly, as well as its sister publications around the Bay Area; Good Times, the North Bay Bohemian and the Pacific Sun and East Bay Express. The group also publishes ten community newspapers, as well as magazines and related digital titles.

== Early life ==
Born in suburban New Jersey, where his parents were school teachers, Pulcrano entered the publishing field while still in junior high, when he produced an underground newspaper at the Wardlaw Country Day School in Plainfield. He was asked to leave the school as a result and attended public schools afterwards, graduating at 16 and joining the staff of the San Diego Reader. At age 19, he went to Los Angeles to help publisher Jay Levin launch the LA Weekly.

== Career ==
=== Weekly newspapers ===
After graduating from University of California, Santa Cruz, Pulcrano founded the Los Gatos Weekly in the Silicon Valley community of Los Gatos. Pulcrano served as publisher, editor and owner. In 1990, it merged with the Times-Observer into the Los Gatos Weekly-Times.

Three years after founding the Los Gatos Weekly, Pulcrano expanded his efforts into the greater Silicon Valley region with the launch of Metro Silicon Valley. Inspired by Levin's LA Weekly and the alt-weeklies that were then appearing in major American cities, Metro offers political reporting as well as calendar listings, music reviews and critical coverage of the performing and visual arts, as well as movie reviews. Based in downtown San Jose, which had been in a state of decline for two decades, Metro championed arts, independent cinema, small theater and retail revitalization in the city's core. Metro's investigative journalism was responsible in 2013 for the prosecution and conviction of Santa Clara County Supervisor George Shirakawa Jr. on multiple felony corruption charges. The newspaper also sparked state Fair Political Practices Commission and Grand Jury investigations of San Jose City Councilman Xavier Campos' campaign activity and has reported over the past decade on the financial relationship between the nonprofit Working Partnerships USA and the South Bay Labor Council. The investigative reports were followed by attacks posted to an anonymous attack web site and on the day that Metro published an exposé on the use of monies raised for low income children's health care premiums to fund political campaigns, at a press conference which highlighted hyperlinks from Metro's web site to an adult ad web site.

Over the next decade, Pulcrano oversaw the purchase and startups of five more community weekly newspapers in Santa Clara County, including the Saratoga News, Cupertino Courier, Sunnyvale Sun, Willow Glen Resident and Campbell Reporter. In 1999, these newspapers and the Los Gatos Weekly-Times, were spun off as the Silicon Valley Community Newspapers group and sold in December 2002 to a Metro executive who sold them to Knight-Ridder in 2005, the year before the sale of its Bay Area newspapers to Dean Singleton's MediaNews Corp., now known as Digital First and controlled by Alden Global Capital. In 1994, Pulcrano returned to his college town of Santa Cruz to launch Metro Santa Cruz and purchased the Sonoma County Independent. In 2000, he rebranded the publication North Bay Bohemian to support the Santa Rosa paper's expanded coverage of Napa and Marin counties. Metro Santa Cruz was renamed Santa Cruz Weekly in 2009. Santa Cruz Weekly ended its run in April 2014 when Metro purchased its weekly competitor Good Times, along with three community weeklies south of Silicon Valley: the Gilroy Dispatch, Morgan Hill Times and Hollister Free Lance.

In May 2015, Pulcrano negotiated the purchase of the oldest alternative weekly in the Western U.S., the Pacific Sun, and told the Silicon Valley Business Journal that the group's circulation had grown from 110,000 to 190,000 over a 14-month period.

In 2020, the company was rebranded Weeklys and purchased the East Bay Express. Shortly after that purchase, Weeklys launched a bi-monthly magazine home-delivered to neighborhoods in the Berkeley and Oakland hills and Piedmont.

Later in 2020, Weeklys purchased the Scotts Valley-based Press Banner.

In 2021, the group grew to 14 publications with the startup of the Los Gatan, a home-delivered weekly published for residents of Los Gatos and Monte Sereno, California.

On May 3, 2022, Weeklys purchased the 157-year-old Healdsburg Tribune after its shutdown, which its non-profit owners had announced "is ending its coverage of the community, ceasing all newsgathering activities and closing its downtown office, effective immediately." Pulcrano's team published a revived edition days later, which one writer described as "a crazy-quick, totally-out-of-the-blue sale and turnaround of our beloved local paper." "We are surprised, gratified and a little astonished," said Nancy Dobbs, president of the board of directors of Sonoma County Local News Initiative, which sold the newspaper's assets to Weeklys.

=== Online entrepreneurship ===
As the newspaper group flourished, Pulcrano launched one of Silicon Valley's first online community portals. In 1993, as a board member of the Association of Alternative Newsweeklies, he wrote a paper "The Alternative Press at the Crossroads: Will We Be Players in the New Information Age Or Road Kill on the Digital Highway?" That same year, he launched LiveWire, an early online player offering email, newsgroups, networking and live chatrooms.

The following year, he launched Boulevards New Media, with the stated intention of "inventing the local media of the future". The company is built around a Pulcrano's portfolio of "cityname.com" Web domains, including Seattle.com, SanFrancisco.com, LosAngeles.com, Philadelphia.com and more than 100 others – including 20 of the nation's top 30 markets."Urbanview Closes, Staff Shifts to Boulevards". Altweeklies.com. AAN News. October 4, 2002. Boulevards has never been sold, acquired, venture-funded or taken public.

Pulcrano served as chairman of the board of Associated Cities, LLC for two years in 2006 and 2007. He continues to write and oversee operations in both his newspaper and online ventures.

== Other ventures ==
Pulcrano used SXSW as an inspiration for a technology and arts festival in Silicon Valley, C2SV. Pulcrano also chairs the San Jose Downtown Association's marketing, dining and arts committee, where he has sought to revitalize downtown San Jose.

He is also the owner and operator of Music in the Park (San Jose), and annual concert series held in San Jose's Plaza de César Chávez.
