= BCN Mes =

Monthly cultural newspaper

- Type: Monthly free newspaper
- Format: Tabloid
- Founded: 2011
- Language: English, Castellano and Catalan
- Headquarters: Barcelona
- Circulation: 15,000
- Price: Free
- Website: www.bcnmes.com

BCN MES is a monthly cultural newspaper in and about Barcelona. The articles, reviews, recommendations, and event listings are written by an international staff of contributors in English, Castellano (Spanish), and Catalan. Content is written in original version depending on the preferred language of the contributor. The newspaper also features contributions by local illustrator, photographers and designers.

BCN Mes is also an online resource that contains complementary content to the print edition such upcoming events and restaurant reviews.

While the writing style is somewhat relaxed and irreverent, it also deals with real themes present in modern-day Barcelona. For example, construction of the new high-speed train link, to more cultural themes such as the creation of the first multicultural centre for the arts an NGO called Gracia Arts Project, connecting foreign and local art lovers.

== Content ==
BCN MES typically contains 24 pages with subdivisions of reviews, columns, and listings about current events occurring in Barcelona. The Shortlist section contains 6 critiques of local restaurants, bars, and shops. The opinion columns address subjects such as local politics, fiction, poetry, crimes, language and culture. The listings cover upcoming events such as concerts, theatre, exhibitions, inaugurations, festivals, films, sales, special events, and conferences. The paper's creative writing section illustrates local talent and originality. Every edition contains a theme on its front page that the following content loosely addresses.

== Circulation and Distribution ==
BCN MES currently has a circulation of 15,000 papers distributed throughout 500 locations in Barcelona. These locations include bars, shops, restaurants, art galleries, movie cinemas, clubs, schools, hostels, and civic centers.

== Operations ==
BCN MES is an independent paper that prints 11 times a year (skipping August). BCN MES is distributed in the city of Barcelona in the areas of Gràcia, Eixample, Raval, Sant Antoni, La Ribera, Poble Sec, Barrio Gótico, El Born, Barceloneta, and Poblenou.

== Collaborations ==
BCN MES has collaborated with The National Radio of Spain, The Association of DJs Contra la Fam, The Spanish Association for Free Press, Scannerfm, Mondosonoro, Sala Apolo, Barcelona Rocks, Forfree.cat, Goorilo. and OTOXO Productions.
