= Sunnyvale Sun =

- Type: Online Newspaper
- Publisher: MediaNews Group
- Language: English
- Headquarters: San Jose, CA Santa Clara County
- Circulation: 21,350
- Website: www.mercurynews.com/location/sunnyvale/

The Sunnyvale Sun is a weekly newspaper published on Fridays serving the city of Sunnyvale, California and surrounding Santa Clara county. Its circulation is estimated to be 21,350. The Sunnyvale Sun is the paper of record for Sunnyvale, where community public notices are posted.

== History ==
The Sun may have been originally founded in the early 1900s, as there was a paper by that name then. It was subsequently called the Sunnyvale Standard from around 1904–1958. For a short time in 1959 it was renamed the Sunnyvale Standard and the Daily Mountain View Register Leader.

In its current form, the Sunnyvale Sun was founded as part of a group of weekly newspapers in the Metro Newspapers group, called Silicon Valley Community Newspapers. Dan Pulcrano and David Cohen co-founded Metro Newspapers in 1985. In 2001, Silicon Valley Community Newspapers, spun off from Metro Newspapers, under chief executive officer David Cohen. In 2005, Cohen sold Silicon Valley Community Newspapers to Knight Ridder, though he stayed on as publisher and chief executive for the SVCN papers.

In 2006, Knight Ridder was purchased by McClatchy Co., which immediately sold SVCN and the San Jose Mercury News to MediaNews Group. MediaNews Group is now known as Digital First Media. Silicon Valley Community Newspapers and the Sunnyvale Sun are published as part of the San Jose Mercury News. As part of its merger with San Jose Mercury News, Sunnyvale Sun is offered as part of a subscription model, rather than as a free weekly paper.
