= Peninsula Times Tribune =

Newspaper published in Palo Alto, California

- Type: Daily newspaper
- Owner: Tribune Newspaper Company
- Founder(s): W.V. Burr; Charles. W. Jones
- Founded: January 5, 1893 (as the Palo Alto Times)
- Ceased publication: March 12, 1993
- Language: English
- City: Palo Alto, California
- Country: United States
- OCLC number: 27847363

The Peninsula Times Tribune was a daily newspaper serving Palo Alto, Redwood City, and neighboring cities in the San Francisco Peninsula of California. It originated in 1893, and ceased in 1993.

== History ==
On January 5, 1893, W.V. Burr and Charles. W. Jones published the first edition of the Palo Alto Times. That November, Charles F. Gilmore became sole owner. In November 1895, Gilmore retired due to ill health and was succeeded by Thomas W. Kemp.

In November 1896, Frances A. "Frank" Kasson started the Palo Alto Live Oak. In August 1897, A.C. Stephen and R.A. Thompson took over the Times. In January 1899, Henry W. Simkins acquired sole ownership of the Live Oak from his partner Kasson.

In June 1900, the Times and Live Oak merged under Thompson and Simkins. Ownership would continue to change every few years over the next two decades. In 1905, the Palo Alton, then owned by S.W. Charles, merged with the Times. The two weeklies were consolidated to form a daily newspaper called the Daily Times.

In 1919, George F. Morell and Dallas E. Wood bought the Times from Simkins and W.H. Kelly. The sale price was less than $25,000. Morell worked as business manager while Wood served as editor and wrote a daily column. William F. Henry, a third partner, headed production. In 1923, the Morell and Wood launched a second paper called the Redwood City Tribune. In 1936, they acquired the Burlingame Advance-Star from A.B. Cargill. The three papers would be managed by Peninsula Newspapers Inc., an employee owned corporation. By 1969, the three papers had 626 employees with a combined circulation of 117,533 and $10 million in annual sales.

In March 1973, the Advance-Star ceased. In January 1974, Wood died at age 87. In September 1977, Harte Hanks offered to buy PNI, but a month later it was announced the Tribune Newspaper Company had reached an agreement to acquire the firm. At that time the Times had a circulation of 45,000 and the Tribune had a circulation of 20,000. Employee stockholders voted to approved the sale that December. The sale price was $28 million. In April 1978, Morell died at age 91.

In March 1979, the Times and Tribune were merged to form a single paper called the Peninsula Times Tribune due to declining circulation. In July 1992, the paper laid off 20% of staff. In November 1992, the Times Tribune was officially put up for sale. By then, only 270 employees remained with a circulation around 38,000. In February 1993, Tribune Co. announced it would close the paper if a buyer was not found. On March 12, 1993, the Times Tribune ceased publication. Three of the firms nine papers (Los Altos Town Crier, Mountain View Town Crier and Cupertino Courier) were saved from closure after the assets were sold to Select Communications.

In March 1994, the Times Tribune's office was sold for up to $10 million to a developer who intended to demolish the two acre site and construct a mix of office space and housing. In July 1994, the Palo Alto City Council agreed to accept the paper's archive, 39 file cabinets and 69 boxes filled with clippings, photographs, microfilm and other items, and have the items professionally archived and distributed to local historical societies, including the Palo Alto Historical Association.
