= The Healdsburg Tribune =

Sonoma County, California, newspaper

- Type: Weekly newspaper
- Owner: Weeklys
- Founder(s): Isidore Abraham; Louis Meyer
- Publisher: Rosemary Olson
- President: Dan Pulcrano
- Founded: March 21, 1888; 138 years ago
- Language: English
- City: Healdsburg, California
- Country: United States
- Sister newspapers: The Windsor Times; Sonoma West Times & News; Cloverdale Reveille
- OCLC number: 925551207
- Website: healdsburgtribune.com

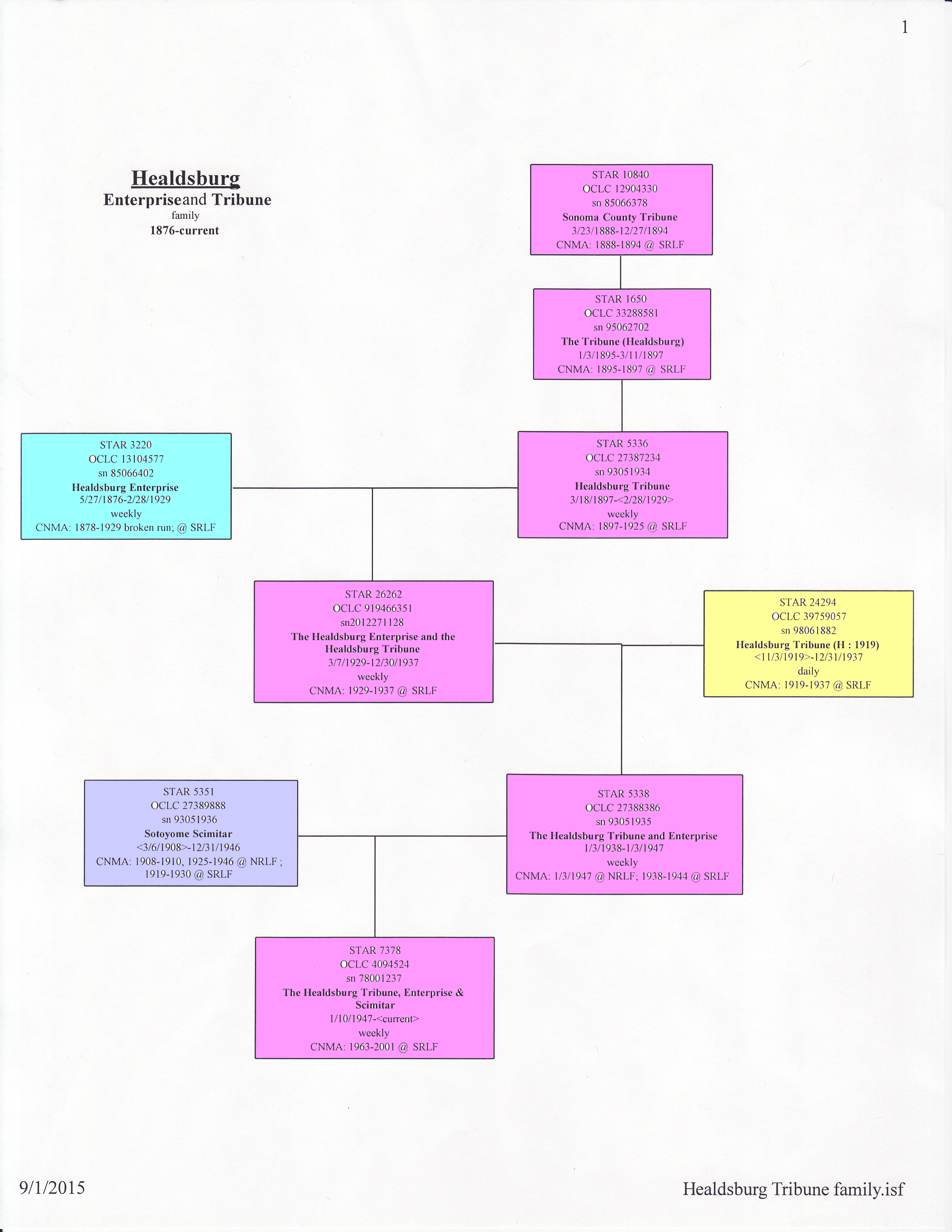
Healdsburg Tribune Family Tree

The Healdsburg Tribune is a weekly newspaper covering the community of Healdsburg, California and the surrounding areas.

== History ==
The newspaper began publication March 21, 1888 as the Sonoma County Tribune. Its editors and proprietors were Isidore Abraham and Louis Meyer. The paper was soon renamed to the Healdsburg Tribune and Meyer sold it in March 1897 to Frank W. Cooke, of Oakland. In December 1908, Cooke sold the paper to Rev. E.B. Ware. A year later Ware sold the Tribune to Alexander Crossan, formerly of the Turlock Republican. In 1911, Cooke reacquired the paper from Crossan. He sold it five years later to Robert L. Dunlap. Cooke took over the paper again after a few months.

M. Earle Adams took over ownership from Cooke in 1918. He purchased the rival Healdsburg Enterprise in 1929 and for a time the paper was renamed to the Tribune-Enterprise. Adams published the paper for 18 years until 1937. At that time he leased it for three years to Larry Thatcher. A year later the paper went from a daily to a semi-weekly. In 1941, Adams sold the Tribune for $7,000 to Lawrence J. Rosasco, but reacquired it in 1942 after Rosasco was drafted during World War II to serve as a mechanic at a Pacific naval air base. In 1946, Adams sold the Tribune again, this time to Edd Rountree, former managing editor of the Hanford Sentinel. Rountree bought the Sotoyome Scimitar in August 1946 and the paper ceased six months later. In October 1947, Robert R. Carlson and Ruben E. Carlson bought the paper from Rountree.

Arnold L. Santucci bought the paper in May 1950 and operated it for 13 years. He sold it in June 1962 to Dean Dunnicliff, former publisher of the Dixon Tribune. In 1974, Dean DeVries, co-owner of the Ukiah Daily Journal, bought the Tribune from Dunnicliff. In 1982, the paper was acquired by Kawana Publishers, a subsidiary of The Press Democrat. The whole company was bought by The New York Times Company in May 1985, who that November sold the Tribune to Lesher Communications, of Walnut Creek. At that time the circulation was 5,500. The Tribune became a weekly in 1993.

In 1995, Lesher sold the Tribune and Windsor Times to Beverly Reeves, a real estate marketing consultant and former reporter. In 2000, the Tribune was bought by Rollie Atkinson and Sarah Bradbury, whose company was named Sonoma West Publishers. In 2020, the company ceased print publication of all its papers except for the Tribune. A nonprofit was then formed to take ownership of the newsites and the Tribune.

The nonprofit Sonoma County Local News Initiative announced the Tribune's shutdown on April 28, 2022, and it was subsequently rescued by Weeklys, the owners of the North Bay Bohemian. The Tribune continued publication on schedule on May 5, 2022. “We are surprised, gratified and a little astonished,” said Nancy Dobbs, president of the board of directors of Sonoma County Local News Initiative, which sold the newspaper's assets to Weeklys.

== Related titles ==
Related titles include the Democratic Standard (1865–1868), Russian River Flag (1868 to 1887), Healdsburg Enterprise (1876–1929) and Sotoyome Scimitar (1908–1946).
