= Willow Glen Resident =

Weekly newspaper in San Jose, CA, US

- Type: Weekly newspaper
- Format: Broadsheet
- Owner: Digital First Media
- Publisher: Joe Guerra, III
- Editor: Mario Dianda
- Founded: 1953; 72 years ago
- Language: English
- Headquarters: San Jose, California
- Circulation: 20,150
- OCLC number: 39758178
- Website: www.mercurynews.com/willow-glen

The Willow Glen Resident is a free weekly newspaper based in San Jose, California. In partnership with The Mercury News, it serves the Willow Glen neighborhood of the city of San Jose and surrounding Santa Clara County, California. The newspaper covers local news, sports, business and community events and is described as providing news and features with a focus on local government issues and decisions made. It is published weekly on Fridays. With 41,310 readers, according to the American Newspaper Representative database, the Willow Glen Resident has a free weekly circulation of 20,150. The newspaper is owned by Digital First Media and edited by Mario Dianda.

== History ==
Willow Glen Resident was founded in 1953 by Harvey D. Jorden as the Greater Willow Glen Resident. In 1987, the name of the newspaper was changed to its current title - Willow Glen Resident. The paper has also been known as the Willow Glen Resident news and the Willow Glen/Rose Garden Resident News.

== Awards ==
In 2017, the Willow Glen Resident won an Honorable Mention in the Investigative Reporting category in its division of California's Better Newspapers Contest.
