= Calaveras Enterprise =

Weekly newspaper published in San Andreas, California

- Type: Weekly newspaper
- Founder: Oscar A. Mellin
- Publisher: Corissa Davidson
- Staff writers: Tori James; Lance Armstrong; Jason Currier
- Founded: 1963
- Language: English
- Headquarters: 698 E Saint Charles Street, San Andreas, CA,
- Website: calaverasenterprise.com

The Calaveras Enterprise is a weekly newspaper in San Andreas, California.

== History ==
On September 18, 1963, the first edition of the Calaveras Enterprise was published. Its first editor was Jack E. Kemp. The owner and first publisher was patent attorney Oscar A. Mellin. In 1967, the paper entered talks to merge with the Amador Dispatch but a deal never materialized.

In 1973, a judge cited the Enterprise for contempt of court for an editorial Mellin wrote suggesting the local court was a "Kangaroo court" after the judge ordered a dog seized for trespassing on his property and brought charges against the owner. The case garnered national attention as it was seen as a battle over the First Amendment.

In 1980, lawyer Harold "Hal" J. Truett, who helped establish the Marin County Public Defender's office, retired and joined his father-in-law in running the Enterprise. Mellin died a year later.

In 1998, the paper was acquired from Hal and Lois Truett by Calaveras First Corp., a group headed by San Francisco attorney Ralph Alldredge. Co-owner Darrell Philips, formerly of the Manteca Bulletin, was named publisher. At that time the Enterprise was twice-weekly and had a circulation of 5,000.

Alldredge became co-owner of Tank Town Media, which purchased the Tracy Press in 2012. Bruce Kyse was hired as publisher in 2015. At some point Alldredge was elected president of the California News Publishers Association. He died in October 2022. That December, Corissa Davidson, the Enterprise's general manager, bought the paper.
