= The Pajaronian =

Weekly newspaper in Watsonville, California

- Type: Weekly newspaper
- Owner: Weeklys
- Founder: J.A. Cottle
- Publisher: Jeanie Johnson
- President: Dan Pulcrano
- Editor: Todd Guild
- Founded: 1868
- Language: English
- Headquarters: Watsonville, California
- Circulation: 5,000
- OCLC number: 34563444
- Website: pajaronian.com

The Pajaronian (formerly the Register-Pajaronian) is a newspaper based in Watsonville, California in Santa Cruz County on California's Central Coast. It is published weekly every Friday and owned by Weeklys.

== History ==
In March 1868, J.A. Cottle published the first issue of The Pajaronian for residents of the Pajaro Valley. Later that year, Cotte was assaulted by the owner of a whiskey-mill after reporting that Oscar Penn Fitzgerald went to a saloon to drink whiskey, which he later denied. In 1872, The Pajaronian was acquired by C.O. Cummings, who sold it in 1875 to W.R. Radcliff.

In 1876, S.A. Jones founded a rival paper called the Watsonville Transcript. William H. Wheeler became the owner in 1880. George W. Peckham then became editor and manager while Wheeler remained as proprietor. Two years later, G.W. Peckham became the owner and was succeeded in 1892 by Charles E. Peckham. Two years later he launched a daily edition of the Transcript called the Watsonville Daily Register. In 1901, the papers were sold to C.W. Clough.

In 1901, W.R. Radcliff sold the weekly Pajaronian to his brother George D. Radclif and James G. Piratsky. At that time the paper was expanded to a daily and became a member of the United Press. In May 1904, Charles H. Prisk, formerly of Grass Valley Union, bought the Register. Later that year he bought the Pasadena Star after the owner died and left Watsonville, leaving the Register to his bookkeeper Ernest H. Haack. In 1919, Haack sold the Register to Fred W. Atkinson, former owner of the Benicia Herald. Atkinson was elected Watsonville mayor in 1921 and served three consecutive terms. In 1930, Piratsky and Radcliff sold the Watsonville Evening Pajaronian to Atkinson, owner of the Watsonville Morning Register.

After Atkinson died, his widow sold both papers in 1937 to Fred H. Jenkins and Robert C. Everts who were associated with the John P. Scripps Newspaper Group. The Register and Pajaronian were soon merged to form the Register-Pajaronian. It competed with another paper called the Watsonville Morning Sun until the Scripps chain bought it in 1940 and absorbed the Sun into the Register-Pajaronian.

In 1956, the Register-Pajaronian won the Pulitzer Prize for Public Service for an investigative series by photographer Sam Vestal, working under the leadership of its longtime editor Frank Orr and with assistance of Watsonville Police Chief Frank Osmer. These revelations led to the resignation of Santa Cruz County District Attorney Charles Moore, and the arrest and conviction of one of his associates. In 1980, Piratsky was posthumously inducted into the California Newspaper Hall of Fame.

In 1995, Scripps Howard sold the Register-Pajaronian to News Media Corporation. In 2003, under the leadership of editor Jon Chown, articles by reporter Dave M. Brooks led to the ousting of Watsonville Mayor Richard de La Paz for his involvement in a bar room brawl. De la Cruz was later sentenced to six months in jail. In 2019, NMC sold the Register-Pajaronian to Metro Newspapers. Under the direction of longtime Bay Area publisher Dan Pulcrano, the staff was retained but some changes were made. Its original name, The Pajaronian, was restored, a new logo was introduced, the office was moved back to downtown Watsonville and a weekly lifestyle magazine, Pajaro Valley, began publishing.

== Notable staff ==
- Wes Gallagher was a sports writer for the Register-Pajaronian who went to be a war correspondent during World War II for the Associated Press.
