= Alternative newspaper =

Genre of newspaper

An alternative newspaper is a type of newspaper that eschews comprehensive coverage of general news in favor of stylized reporting, opinionated reviews and columns, and magazine-style feature stories highlighting local people and culture. Its news coverage is more locally focused, and their target audiences are younger than those of daily newspapers. Typically, alternative newspapers are published in tabloid format and printed on newsprint. Other names for such publications include alternative weekly, alternative newsweekly, and alt weekly, as the majority circulate on a weekly schedule.

Most metropolitan areas of the United States and Canada are home to at least one alternative paper. These papers are generally found in such urban areas, although a few publish in smaller cities, in rural areas or exurban areas where they may be referred to as an alt monthly due to the less frequent publication schedule.

== Content ==
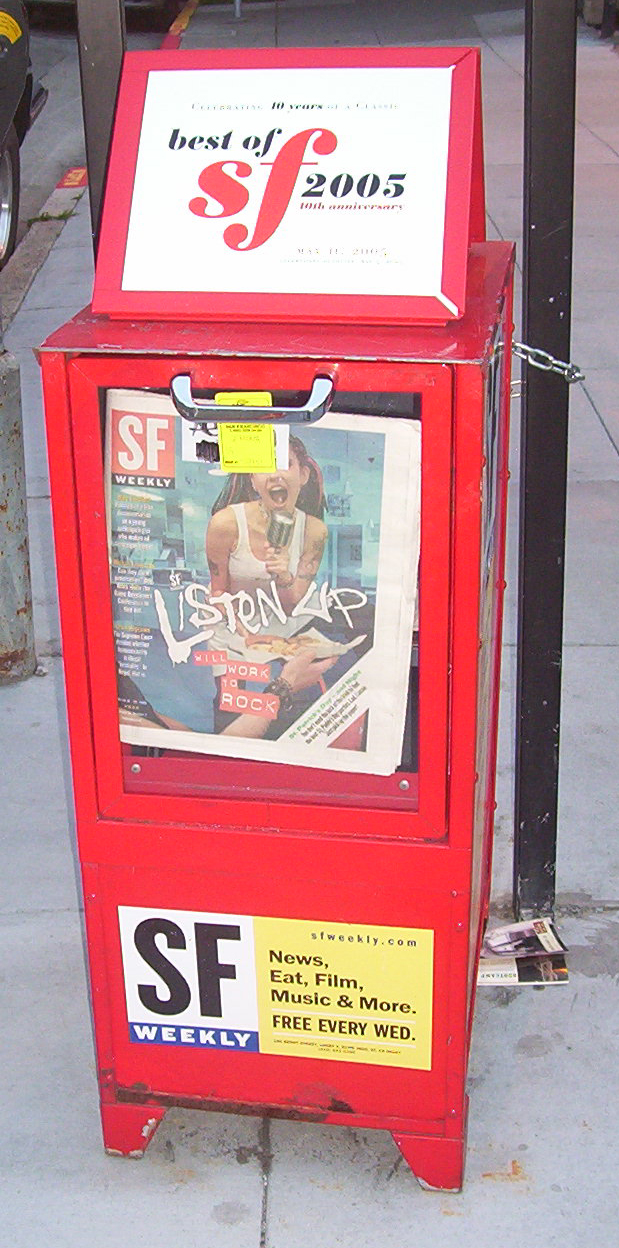
A SF Weekly newspaper box on Sansome Street in San Francisco

Alternative papers have usually operated under a different business model than daily papers. Most alternative papers, such as The Stranger, the Houston Press, SF Weekly, the Village Voice, the New York Press, the Metro Times, the LA Weekly, the Boise Weekly and the Long Island Press, have been free, earning revenue through the sale of advertising space. They sometimes include ads for adult entertainment, such as adult bookstores and strip clubs, which are prohibited in many mainstream daily newspapers. They usually include comprehensive classified and personal ad sections and event listings as well.

Many alternative papers feature an annual "best of" issue, profiling businesses that readers voted the best of their type in the area. Often these papers send out certificates that the businesses hang on their wall or window. This further cements the paper's ties to local businesses.

Alternative newspapers represent the more commercialized and mainstream evolution of the underground press associated with the 1960s counterculture. Their focus remains on arts and entertainment and social and political reportage. Editorial positions at alternative weeklies are predominantly left-leaning, though there is a contingent of conservative and libertarian alt-weeklies. Styles vary sharply among alternative newspapers; some affect a satirical, ironic tone, while others embrace a more straightforward approach to reporting.

Columns commonly syndicated to alternative weeklies include "The Straight Dope", Dan Savage's "Savage Love", Rob Breszny's "Free Will Astrology", and Ben Tausig's crossword puzzle "Ink Well." Quirky, non-mainstream comics, such as Matt Groening's Life in Hell, Lynda Barry's Ernie Pook's Comeek, Ruben Bolling's Tom the Dancing Bug, and Ted Rall's political cartoons are also common.

The Village Voice, based in New York City, was one of the first and best-known examples of the form. Since the Voice's demise in 2018, Marin County's Pacific Sun, founded in 1963, is now the longest-running alternative weekly. The Association of Alternative Newsmedia is the alternative weeklies' trade association. The Ruxton Media Group (formerly known as Voice Media Group Advertising) is the only national advertising sales representative for more than 100 alternative weeklies after the Alternative Weekly Network passed the torch in early March 2025.

== Chains and mergers ==
Some alternative newspapers are independent. However, due in part to increasing concentration of media ownership, many have been bought or launched by larger media conglomerates. The Tribune Company, a multibillion-dollar company that owns the Chicago Tribune, owns four New England alternative weeklies, including the Hartford Advocate and New Haven Advocate.

Creative Loafing, originally only an Atlanta-based alternative weekly, grew into Creative Loafing, Inc. which owned papers in three other southern U.S. cities, as well as the Chicago Reader and Washington City Paper.

Village Voice Media and New Times Media merged in 2006; before that, they were the two largest chains.

The pre-merger Village Voice Media, an outgrowth of New York City's Village Voice, included LA Weekly, OC Weekly, Seattle Weekly, Minneapolis City Pages, and Nashville Scene.

New Times Media included at the time of the merger Cleveland Scene, Dallas Observer, Westword, East Bay Express, New Times Broward-Palm Beach, Houston Press, The Pitch, Miami New Times, Phoenix New Times, SF Weekly and Riverfront Times.

In 2003, the two companies entered into a non-competition agreement which stated that the two would not publish in the same market. Because of this, New Times Media eliminated New Times LA, a competitor to Village Voice Media's LA Weekly, and Village Voice Media ceased publishing Cleveland Free Times, a competitor to New Times Media's Cleveland Scene. The US Justice Department launched an antitrust investigation into the agreement. The case was settled out of court with the two companies agreeing to make available the publishing assets and titles of their defunct papers to potential competitors. The Cleveland Free Times recommenced publication in 2003 under the publication group Kildysart LLC, while the assets of New Times LA were sold to Southland Publishing and relaunched as LA CityBeat.

On October 24, 2005, New Times Media announced a deal to acquire Village Voice Media, creating a chain of 17 free weekly newspapers around the country with a combined circulation of 1.8 million and controlling a quarter of the weekly circulation of alternative weekly newspapers in North America. The deal was approved by the Justice Department and, on January 31, 2006, the companies merged into one, taking the name Village Voice Media.

Phoenix Media/Communications Group, owner of the popular Boston alternative weekly the Boston Phoenix, expanded to Providence, Rhode Island in 1988 with their purchase of NewPaper, which was renamed the Providence Phoenix. In 1999, PM/CG expanded further through New England to Portland, Maine with the creation of the Portland Phoenix. From 1992 through 2005, PM/GC owned and operated the Worcester Phoenix in Worcester, Massachusetts, but PM/GC folded that branch because of Worcester's dwindling art scene.

Nonetheless, a number of owner-operated, non-chain owned alternative papers survive, among them Metro Silicon Valley in San Jose, Pittsburgh City Paper in Pittsburgh, Salt Lake City Weekly, the Pacific Sun, the Bohemian in California's Sonoma and Napa counties, the San Diego Reader, Isthmus in Madison, Wisconsin, Flagpole Magazine in Athens, Georgia, the Boulder Weekly, Willamette Week in Portland, Oregon, Independent Weekly, Yes! Weekly, Creative Loafing, and Triad City Beat in North Carolina, the Austin Chronicle in Texas, The Stranger in Seattle, Washington, Artvoice in Buffalo, New York, the Aquarian Weekly in North Jersey, the Colorado Springs Independent, the Good Times in Santa Cruz, California, New Times in San Luis Obispo and the Sun in Northern Santa Barbara County, California.

In 2026, a group of employees at Creative Loafing Tampa Bay and two local partners purchased the newspaper, making the paper locally-owned for the first time since 2009.

Canadian examples of owner-operated, non-chain owned alternative papers include Vancouver's The Georgia Straight, Toronto's NOW Magazine, Edmonton's Vue Weekly and Halifax's The Coast. Examples outside the United States and Canada include Barcelona's BCN Mes.

== See also ==
- List of alternative weekly newspapers
