= Pacific Sun (newspaper) =

Newspaper in San Rafael, California

- Type: Alternative weekly
- Format: Tabloid
- Owner: Metro Newspapers Dan Pulcrano
- Publisher: Rosemary Olson
- Founded: 1963
- Language: English
- Headquarters: 1020 B St; San Rafael, California 94901; United States
- Circulation: 20,000
- Website: www.pacificsun.com

The Pacific Sun is a free distribution weekly newspaper published in Marin County, just north of San Francisco in the San Francisco Bay Area. It is the longest running alternative weekly in the nation and is published on Wednesdays. Since October 2019, Daedalus Howell has been its editor.

== History ==
The Pacific Sun was founded in April 1963 in California by Merrill and Joann Grohman in the back of a Stinson Beach grocery store. In 1966, the Pacific Sun moved its offices to San Rafael. Steve McNamara, the former Sunday editor of the San Francisco Examiner, bought it from the Grohmans that year.

Alice Yarish worked as a reporter for 11 years for the Pacific Sun.

U.S. Senator Barbara Boxer worked as a reporter for the Pacific Sun for two years in the 1970s, winning a Press Club award for a 1973 story on a state supreme court controversy.

Embarcadero Media, publisher of community weeklies in Palo Alto, Mountain View and Pleasanton, purchased The Sun from McNamara in 2004.

Sam Chapman, a former Chief of Staff to Senator Boxer, served as the paper's publisher until 2010. Gina Channell was publisher of the Pacific Sun from 2010 to 2012. Jason Walsh served as the editor and Dani Burlison replaced Samantha Campos as staff writer in 2010, after Campos replaced Jacob Shafer in 2008.

In October 2012, former Embarcadero principal Bob Heinen purchased the paper and took over as publisher.

In May 2015, Metro Newspapers acquired the Pacific Sun, increasing its portfolio to four Bay Area alternative weeklies. Metro restored circulation cuts that had occurred under the previous ownership and commissioned well-known typographer Jim Parkinson to redraw the Sun's nameplate. Owner Dan Pulcrano promised “investment and creative vision... to produce a free weekly that’s fresh, original and true to its history.”

In December 2019, the Sun commemorated its 55th year of publication with longtime Mill Valley resident Sammy Hagar on its cover.

== The Serial ==
Cyra McFadden’s 1977 best seller, The Serial: a Year in the Life of Marin County, began as a series of 52 installments in the Sun. In 1980, Paramount Pictures made a movie titled Serial based on the book.
