= Good Times (newspaper) =

Weekly newspaper based in Santa Cruz, California

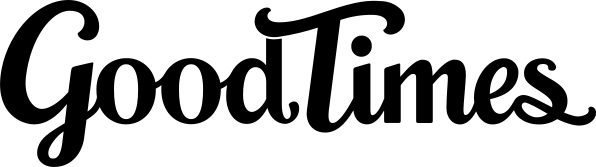
- Type: Alternative weekly
- Format: Tabloid
- Owner: Weeklysmedia group
- Founder: Jay Shore
- Publisher: Dan Pulcrano
- President: Dan Pulcrano
- Editor-in-chief: Brad Kava
- Founded: April 3, 1975
- Headquarters: Santa Cruz, California
- Circulation: 35,000
- ISSN: 0164-4033
- OCLC number: 4708924
- Website: goodtimes.sc

Good Times is a free-circulation weekly newspaper based in Santa Cruz, California. Good Times is distributed in Santa Cruz County, a coastal area that includes Capitola, Rio del Mar, Aptos, and Watsonville. It is owned by the Northern California–based Metro Newspapers. Dan Pulcrano is the CEO and executive editor.

Good Times publishes features on news, opinion, entertainment, arts and events. Originally, the publication started as a reaction to the political journalism of the 1970s and focused on entertainment. "Good Times’ motto was 'lighter than air.' They only printed good news," recalls former columnist Bruce Bratton.

== History ==
Good Times was founded in 1975 by Jay Shore, who remained its owner/operator and editor for 13 years. Shore established Good Times amidst a proliferation in the 1970s of short-lived free counterculture newspapers in Santa Cruz County that included The Free Spaghetti Dinner, Sundaz!, Santa Cruz Times, People’s Press and the Santa Cruz Independent.

In 1988, Shore sold the paper to Independent Newspapers of New Zealand, part of Rupert Murdoch’s group of holdings, a year before much of downtown Santa Cruz was destroyed in the Loma Prieta earthquake.

In 1998, Independent Newspapers sold Good Times to Central Valley Publishing, later renamed Pacific-Sierra Publishing. In 2003, Pacific-Sierra head Anthony Allegretti lead a buyout to form a new company, MainStreet Media Group.

In 2014, New England–based Brookside Capital sold Good Times. to Metro Newspapers, which owned the competing Santa Cruz Weekly, returning the publication to local ownership for the first time since the 1980s. The Santa Cruz Weekly, which began as Metro Santa Cruz in 1994, combined operations with Good Times following the purchase.

On the eve of the sale, former Good Times publisher Ron Slack complained about the lack of investment in the product by its former owners, saying Good Times didn't get much support from its corporate parent in upgrades in equipment and software.

Good Times was an active sponsor with Tom Schot in presenting disc sports to Californians by way of the 1978 Santa Cruz Flying Disc Classic and the Santa Cruz Good Times Ultimate Team.

Good Times was the first publication to give voice to Rob Brezsny's "Free Will Astrology" Column.

On July 1, 2019, Good Times expanded its South County reach with the purchase of the Pulitzer Prize-winning Watsonville Register-Pajaronian, returning it to local control after 78 years of ownership by two multiple-state national media companies. It also acquired as part of the transaction the Aptos Life monthly.
