= Metro Silicon Valley =

Weekly newspaper in California, US

- The July 11, 2012, issue of Metro
- Type: Alternative weekly
- Format: Tabloid
- Owner: Weeklys
- Editor-in-chief: Dan Pulcrano
- Founded: 1985; 41 years ago
- Headquarters: 380 South First Street; San Jose, California, United States
- Circulation: 50,000
- Sister newspapers: Good Times, North Bay Bohemian, Pacific Sun
- ISSN: 0882-4290
- OCLC number: 11831028
- Website: metrosiliconvalley.com

Metro, also known as Metro Silicon Valley, is a free weekly newspaper published by the San Jose, California-based Weeklys media group for four decades, a period during which its readership area became known as Silicon Valley.

Metro was one of the earliest publishers to enter the digital media revolution, adding voice messaging to its classified advertising in the 1980s and free online access in 1993. It was the first newspaper to offer a downloadable PDF edition, with the launch of MetroPDF.com in 2003.

The newspaper has been published since 1985 and its principal distribution area encompasses the cities of San Jose, Los Gatos, Campbell, Saratoga, Santa Clara, Sunnyvale, Cupertino, Milpitas, Mountain View, Los Altos and Palo Alto.

The publication's investigative journalism is responsible for Santa Clara County's only felony political corruption conviction. Its reporting also contributed to the defeat of eight-term incumbent congressman Mike Honda by Ro Khanna and a gun permit scandal that led to the removal of Santa Clara County sheriff Laurie Smith.

== Entertainment and investigative journalism ==
Metro is largely read for its coverage of the San Jose region's culture and entertainment scene. It publishes an exhaustive arts section, which includes calendar listings, music reviews, critical coverage of the performing and visual arts, as well as movie reviews and information. The newspaper employed well-regarded film critic Richard von Busack from 1985 until the pandemic. Steve Palopoli edited the publication from March 2005 until December 2008.

In 1986, Metro published the last interview with Don Hoefler, the man credited with naming Silicon Valley. Metro has scooped the daily press on a number of major stories, including the office romance of San Jose Mayor Ron Gonzales in 2000 and the Santa Clara County Grand Jury's plans to indict Gonzales in June 2006.

In 1996, Metro's "Public Eye" column scooped Apple's December 20 announcement of a deal between Steve Jobs' NeXT Inc. and Apple Inc. that led to Jobs' return to Apple.

In 2007, Metro and its sister publication North Bay Bohemian prompted Sen. Dianne Feinstein's resignation from the U.S. Senate's Military Construction Appropriations subcommittee after the two papers published an exposé by Peter Byrne documenting Feinstein's conflicts of interest related to husband Richard C. Blum's ownership interest in two major defense contractors, firms that received billions of dollars in contracts for military construction projects that were approved during Feinstein's tenure on the subcommittee.

In 2012, Metro published a series of articles on Santa Clara County Board of Supervisors chair George Shirakawa, Jr., who had failed to file legally required campaign disclosure statements and had not turned in receipts for 175 taxpayer-underwritten meal charges. The disclosures resulted in an investigation by the Fair Political Practices Commission and the Santa Clara County District Attorney's office. Shirakawa pleaded guilty on March 1, 2013, to five felonies and seven misdemeanors and resigned his office. Assistant District Attorney Karyn Sinunu Towery credited Metro's reports with prompting the criminal investigation at the press conference announcing the plea and resignation. The House Committee on Ethics investigated Rep. Mike Honda following revelations in Metro that contributors were receiving favors from the congressman's office.

== Notable alumni ==
The newspaper has helped launch the careers of several notable writers, including British television journalist Louis Theroux, author Jonathan Vankin, author and educator Gordon Young (Journalist), Vietnamese-American author Andrew Pham, Obama administration education advisor Hal Plotkin, News Director of Vice News Michael Learmonth, and film producer Zack Stentz It also published the early writings of New York Times editorial board member Michelle Goldberg, as well as six-word memoirist Larry Smith and Dave Eggers before they became published authors. It was also one of the first newspapers to publish Matt Groening's Life in Hell long before he created The Simpsons.

== Community involvement ==
In 1986, Metro executive editor Dan Pulcrano co-founded with Ray Rodriguez the San Jose Downtown Association and led the effort to start Music in the Park, a public music festival that was free in its early days and has staged performances by such groups as the Beach Boys, Maroon 5, Billy Preston, Cuco and Tower of Power.

The San Jose Jazz Society was started by Metro jazz writer Sammy Cohen and headquartered in Metro's office. The outgrowth was the annual San Jose Jazz Festival.

During the 1990s, Metro purchased community newspapers from companies such as the Tribune Company and established Silicon Valley Community Newspapers, which it sold in 2001.

Metro was the first to call for a Sunshine Ordinance during the 1998 mayor's race. An ordinance was passed in 2009.

In explaining the newspaper's mission on its 20th anniversary, executive editor Pulcrano said, "We have championed independent businesses and small theaters in an effort to help the valley establish its own cultural identity. We have pushed for preservation of historic buildings and agricultural lands that represent the valley's heritage and soul. And we have promoted sensible, pedestrian-oriented development that gets people out of their cars so they can get to know one another. A newspaper at its best should be a community-builder."

In 2012, Metro sponsored the Silicon Valley Sound Experience, a multi-venue music festival, which led to the establishment of Creative Convergence Silicon Valley, or C2SV, the following year. The 2013 event included performances by Iggy and The Stooges and a three-day technology conference with appearances by Steve Wozniak, Nolan Bushnell and John McAfee. The 2015 C2SV brought camera phone inventor Philippe Kahn to the stage of the California Theatre.

== Early online player ==
Metro was an early participant in the online publishing revolution, launching the Livewire online service in 1993, one of the first online efforts by a non-daily newspaper publisher. The service offered free email accounts, online commerce, chats, posting forums and online articles.

Virtual Valley, a similar service with an emphasis on covering Silicon Valley communities, was launched the following year and helped put the city governments of San Jose, Milpitas and Los Gatos online. Also in 1994, Metro established Boulevards, a network of city guides that pre-dated Citysearch and Microsoft's short-lived "Sidewalk" service.

In 1995, Metro launched the online version of the newspaper under the brand Metroactive.
