= Mass media in Monterey County, California =

Mass media in Monterey County includes print media (newspapers and magazines) and broadcast media (radio and television) in Monterey County, California.

It includes the cities of Monterey and Salinas, as well as the towns in the Salinas Valley in the Central Coast of California.

== Television ==
The Monterey-Salinas metropolitan statistical (or service) area (MSA) is served by a variety of local television stations, and is the 124th largest designated market area (DMA) in the U.S. with 222,900 homes. As of 2025:

- KSBW-DT2 - Central Coast ABC - (ABC) - Salinas (Comcast Cable 7)
- KSBW - channel 8: - (NBC) - Salinas (Comcast Cable 6)
- KMUV-LD - channel 23: - (Telemundo) - Monterey/Salinas/Santa Cruz (Simulcast of KSTS 48)
- KQET - channel 25: - (PBS) - Watsonville (Simulcast of San Francisco's KQED)
- KMBY-LD - channel 27 - (This TV) - Monterey (Comcast Cable 19)
- KDJT-CD - channel 33: - (UniMás) - Salinas/Monterey
- KCBA - channel 35: - (The CW) - Salinas (Comcast Cable 14)
- KBIT-LD - channel 43: - (Azteca América) - Monterey/Salinas
- KION - channel 46: - (CBS) - Monterey (Comcast Cable 5)
- KION-DT2 - channel 46.2: - (Fox Broadcasting Company) - Monterey (Comcast Cable 3)
- KSMS-TV - channel 67: - (Univision) - Monterey (Comcast Cable 4)
- KRON-TV - channel 4: - (KRON) - Bay Area (Comcast Cable 193)

=== ABC affiliate ===
The Monterey-Salinas area lost its American Broadcasting Company broadcast affiliate in 2000, when KNTV was purchased, and then became the NBC station for the San Francisco Oakland San Jose metropolitan area. KNTV later moved its tower from Loma Prieta Peak to San Bruno Mountain, ceasing its coverage in Monterey. At that time, ABC reached an agreement with Comcast Cable to provide a slightly-customized feed of San Francisco ABC O&O KGO-TV for the Monterey area, branded simply as ABC 7 and occasionally referred to by the mock call letters AABC. On December 20, 2010, KSBW announced that they will carry ABC programming over on its second digital subchannel, which has already launched on April 18, 2011.

== Radio ==
Radio stations Monterey-Salinas-Santa Cruz area of dominant influence (ADI) or continuous measurement market (CMM) that are in Monterey County.

=== FM ===
List of Monterey County FM frequency stations:

- KAZU - 90.3 (Pacific Grove)
- KHDC - 90.9 (Chualar)
- KSPB - 91.9 (Pebble Beach)
- KTOM - 92.7 (Marina)
- KEXA - 93.9 (King City)
- KRML - 102.1 (Carmel) The Locals Station for the Monterey Bay, Rock/Indie Rock/Local Bands & local emergency information
- KKHK - 95.5 (Carmel)
- KWAV - 96.9 (Monterey)
- KARW - 97.9 (Salinas)
- KLOK - 99.5/99.9 (Greenfield)
- KPRC - 100.7 (Salinas)
- KCDU - 101.7 (Carmel)
- KRKC - 102.1 (King City)
- KDON - 102.5 (Salinas)
- KRAY - 103.5 (Salinas)
- KDFG - 103.9 (Monterey)
- KHIP - 104.3 (Gonzales)
- KOCN - 105.1 (Salinas)
- KSES - 107.1 (Seaside)
- KFRS - 89.9/92.9 (Soledad, King City)

=== AM ===
List of Monterey County AM frequency stations:

- KRXA - 540 (Carmel Valley)
- KKMC - 880 (Gonzales)
- KDBV - 980 (Salinas)
- KYAA - 1200 (Monterey)
- KMBY - 1240 (Monterey)
- KRML - 1410 (Carmel)
- KION - 1460 (Salinas)
- KRKC - 1490 (King City)
- KTGE - 1570 (Salinas)
- The Monterey Channel - 1610 (Monterey)
- Local Emergency Radio Station - 1620 (Pebble Beach)

=== Internet ===
List of Monterey County Internet Radio stations:

- SalinasRadio (Monterey County)

== Newspapers ==
- Carmel Pine Cone
- Cedar Street Times
- Gonzales Tribune
- Greenfield News
- King City Rustler
- The Monterey County Herald
- Monterey County Weekly
- The Salinas Californian
- El Sol
- Soledad Bee

== Magazines ==
- 831 Magazine
- ARTWORKS Magazine
- Carmel Magazine
- Coastal Canine Magazine
- Monterey County Magazine
- WestCoast Magazine
