= King City Rustler =

- Type: Weekly newspaper
- Owner: New SV Media Inc.
- Editor: Ryan Cronk
- Founded: 1901
- Language: English
- Headquarters: 522B Broadway, King City, CA 93930 (Monterey County)
- Circulation: 2,850
- Sister newspapers: Soledad Bee, Greenfield News, Gilroy Dispatch
- Website: kingcityrustler.com

The King City Rustler is a weekly newspaper that serves King City in southern Monterey County, California. It is owned by New SV Media, a subsidiary of Weeklys.

== History ==
On May 11, 1901, Frederick Godfrey Vivian published the first edition of the King City Rustler. Vivian bicycled from San Jose to King City and started the newspaper with some used printing equipment. He had previously launched papers in Angels Camp and Niles, which he sold off before launching the Rustler. The name was the winning suggestion from a straw poll Vivian held with patrons at a barber shop. A "rustler " was a slang term for a guy who scurried around and got things done. Vivian penned a popular column called "Record Of personal Opinion." In a 1909 article, Vivian suffered an illness and wrote of an interview he imagined having with the Grim Reaper.

The Rustler was the only paper in King City until 1914, when a group of businessmen who disliked Vivian started a rival paper called The King City Herald. The first editor was L.A. Folden. The Herald was created by Hugh Osborn, formerly city attorney of Santa Cruz, and transferred to C.H. Hartson in 1926. Three years later the Rustler became a bi-weekly publication. In 1937, Vivian's business manager and son-in-law Bill Steglich engineered a merger between the two papers. For a time the combined paper was called the Rustler-Herald.

Vivian was known as the "father of irrigation" in the Salinas Valley. He was a scribe whose dream was to bring the Salinas Valley under irrigation. He first decided to publish a sheet on the irrigation prospects of King City and the surrounding area. He was known as "Visionary Vivian" and often offended the local land barons whose land grants he dreamed of cutting up and turning into small farms. Due to his efforts and the publication of a special "Irrigation Edition" of the paper, Vivian was appointed to membership on the state advisory board in 1911 and attended the National Irrigation Congress in Chicago. The publication maintains a "Focus on Agriculture" section.

Vivian refused several opportunities to run for public office because he wanted to "be my own man." He died in 1945 at age 83. At that time he was considered one of the oldest active editors and publishers in the country. He was succeeded by Steglich, who died in 1952. The Rustler was then passed down to his wife Ruth Steglich, her sister Beatrice Vivian Casey and nephew Harry Frederick Casey. In 1961, Casey Newspapers bought the Greenfield News, the Soledad Bee in 1967 and Gonzales Tribune in 1974. Around that time Beatrice Vivian Casey published a historical novel set in Monterey County called "A Stranger Came to the Lucas."

In 1988, Fred Vivian was posthumously inducted into the California Newspaper Hall of Fame. In 1995, News Media Corporation purchased The Ruslter and its associated weekly papers from the Casey family. In 2003, Harry Casey was inducted into the California Newspaper Hall of Fame. After 23 years of ownership, NMC in 2019 sold the paper along with the Soledad Bee, Greenfield News and Gonzales Tribune, to New SV Media group, which owned the Gilroy Dispatch, Morgan Hill Times and Hollister Free Lance.
