= Greenfield News =

Weekly newspaper in Greenfield, California, USA

- Type: Weekly newspaper
- Owner: New SV Media
- Founder: Irwin Coffey
- Editor: Ryan Cronk
- Founded: 1936
- Language: English
- Headquarters: King City, California
- City: Greenfield, California
- Circulation: 1,150
- Website: greenfieldnews.com

The Greenfield News is a weekly newspaper that serves Greenfield in central Monterey County, California. It is owned by New SV Media, a subsidiary of Weeklys.

== History ==
In 1936, Irwin Coffey first published the Greenfield News. Coffey previously edited the Gonzales Tribune for a decade. After establishing the News, his brother Charles H. Coffey took over management of the Tribune.

In 1961, Casey Newspapers, owner of the King City Rustler bought the News from Irwin Coffey. In 1995, News Media Corporation purchased the News and its associated weekly papers from the Casey family. After 23 years of ownership, NMC in 2019 sold the paper along with the Soledad Bee, King City Rustler and Gonzales Tribune, to New SV Media group, which owned the Gilroy Dispatch, Morgan Hill Times and Hollister Free Lance.
