= Salinas Valley Tribune =

Newspaper in Salinas Valley, California

- Type: Weekly newspaper
- Format: Broadsheet
- Owner(s): New SV Media Inc.
- Founder(s): Thomas Renison
- Publisher: Jeanie Johnson
- Editor: Ryan Cronk
- Founded: Jan. 24, 1891
- Language: English
- Headquarters: Gonzales, California
- Circulation: 850
- OCLC number: 40329114
- Website: salinasvalleytribune.com

The Salinas Valley Tribune is a weekly newspaper that serves Gonzales in northern Monterey County, California. It is owned by New SV Media, a subsidiary of Weeklys.

== History ==
At age 18, Thomas Renison immigrated from Ireland to the United States, settling in the Bay Area in 1868. Decades later, on January 24, 1891, he published the first edition of the Gonzales Tribune, an independent weekly newspaper. Renison served as a presidential elector with the Democratic State Central Committee, resigning in September 1892.

By 1893, the Tribune had become the largest newspaper in the county, a title it would only hold for a short time. Renison ran the paper for only three years; while editing it he was studying law, and in 1894, after passing the bar, he announced that he was ending his partnership at the Tribune with H.R. Farley and moving to Salinas, where he established a law practice, served several terms as mayor and was elected to state assembly. Farley came to the Tribune in 1893 and took full control after Remsion left. He was joined by Charles H. Coffey in 1897.

Around Halloween of 1898, Farley began to write a series of articles in the paper attacking the Monterey County Sheriff, who had been accused of using names on local tombstones to embezzle county funds intended to feed and clothe prisoners. The articles hurt the reputation of the sheriff, and Farley put himself up as challenger in the next election, using the paper as a campaign vehicle, and winning in a heated contest. Farley's ascension into the position of sheriff, however, would be his end; less than a year into his term his attempted apprehension of a drunken resident led to his murder.

In 1916, Charles Coffey Jr., became publisher. He was assisted by his brother Irwin Coffey, who left in 1936 to found the Greenfield News. Warren Coffey became the third-generation publisher of the Tribune in 1957. He sold the paper in 1967 to Robert and Marilyn Maxwell, who sold it a year later to Joyce and Alan Helseth. The couple declared bankruptcy six years later. In 1974, the Tribune was acquired by Casey Newspapers from the paper's trustee. In 1995, News Media Corporation purchased the Tribune and its associated weekly papers from the Casey family. After 23 years of ownership, NMC in 2019 sold the paper along with the King City Rustler, Soledad Bee and Greenfield News and to New SV Media group, which owned the Gilroy Dispatch, Morgan Hill Times and Hollister Free Lance.

On April 1, 2020, the paper was renamed to the Salinas Valley Tribune. The new logo had been in development before the COVID-19 pandemic hit and the timing of the announcement was coincidental, publisher Jeanie Johnson said.
