= All Saints' Day School =

Private, day school in Carmel, California, United States

All Saints Day School
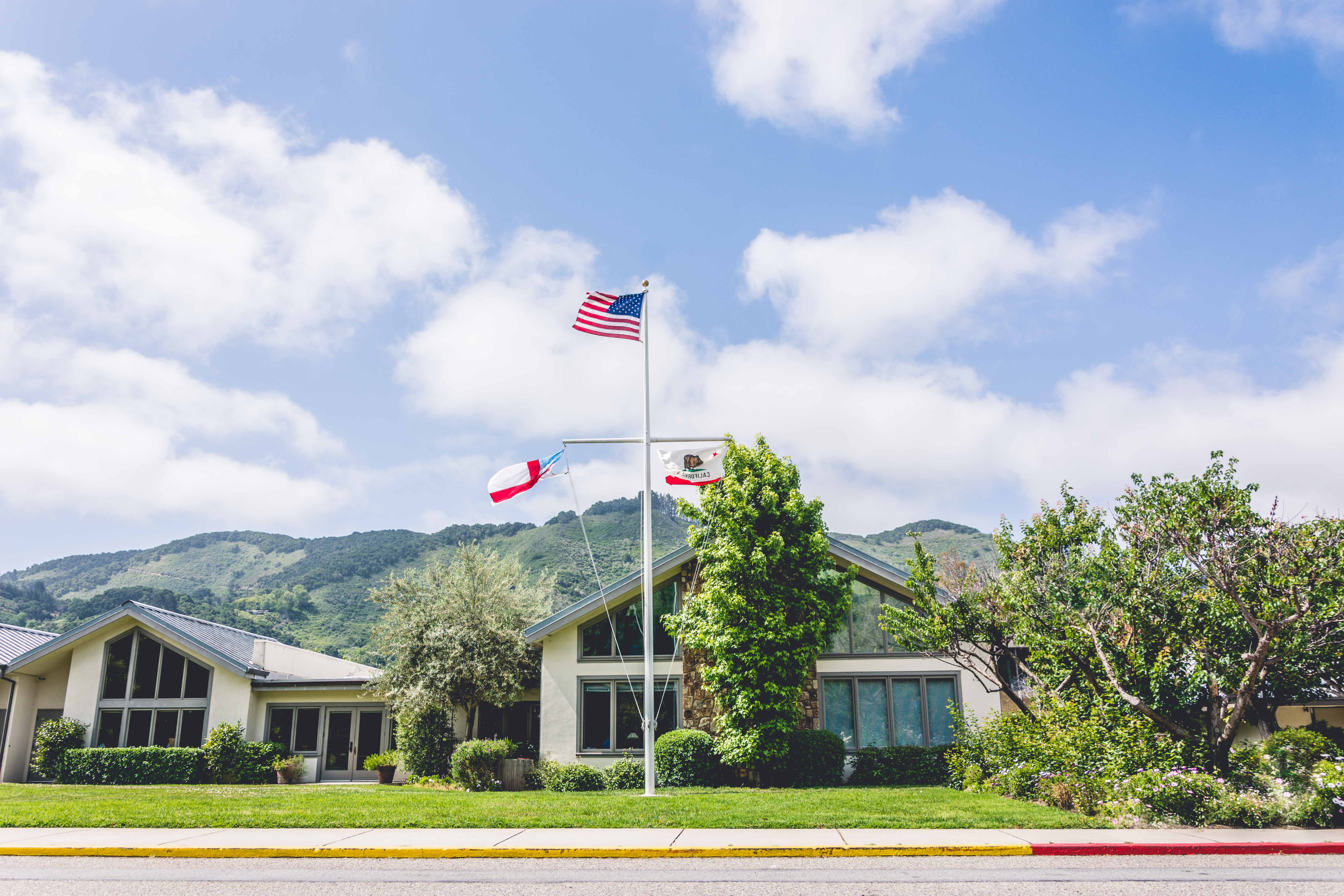

Location
- 8060 Carmel Valley Road; Carmel, (Monterey County), California 93923; United States; 36.529826°N 121.834599°W

Information
- Type: Private, day
- Founder: Three Episcopal Parishes, Founding Headmaster: Reverend Peter Farmer
- Head of school: Sara Brown
- Grades: Preschool-8
- Enrollment: 258 (2025)
- Campus size: 17 acres
- Accreditation: NASC; California Association of Independent Schools
- Affiliations: Member, National Association of Episcopal Schools (NAES)
- Website: www.asds.org

All Saints Day School is a private coeducational school for preschool through grade 8, located on 17 acres in Carmel, California. It was originally named after the first Episcopal bishop of California, William Ingraham Kip; the Bishop Kip School changed its name to All Saints' Episcopal Day School shortly after its founding in Pacific Grove, California in 1961.

The first headmaster was Reverend Peter Farmer, also known as Father Farmer, who remained in that position for sixteen years. On its first day of classes the school had five students in kindergarten, eight in first grade, and four members of faculty and staff, including Father Farmer. As of August 2025, according to the school website, the campus consists of 17 acres, with 258 students in preschool to 8th grade, and has 50 faculty members.

Former Super Bowl winning linebacker and Captain of the New Orleans Saints Defensive Unit, Scott Fujita served as Head of School from July 1, 2019, to June 30, 2024. As of July 1, 2024, Sara Brown, former Assistant Head of School, is Head of School, and Fujita serves as chair of the board of trustees.

== History ==
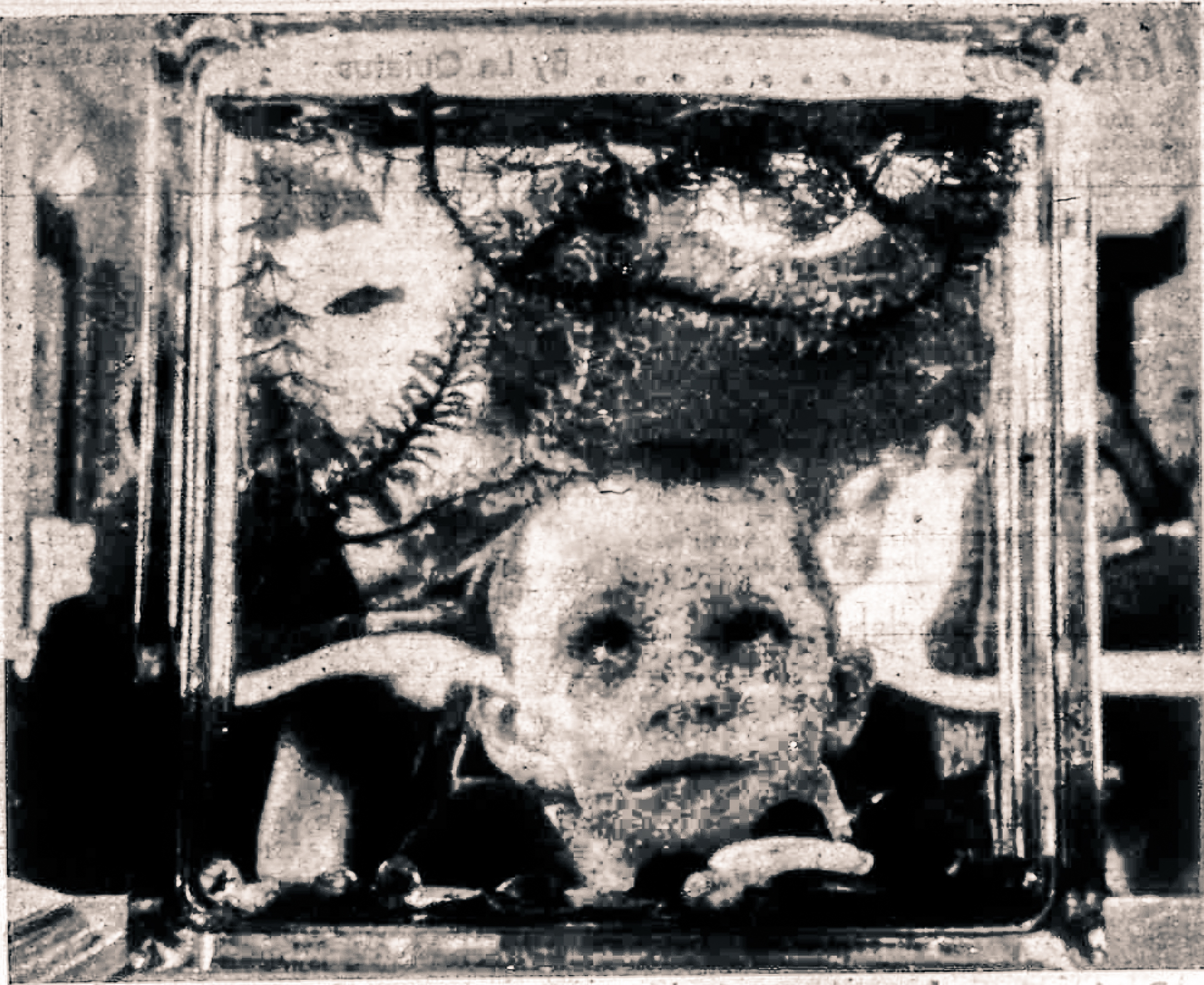
Timothy Messick, founding class of All Saints Day School, peering into aquarium. Monterey Peninsula Herald, Sep. 30, 1961

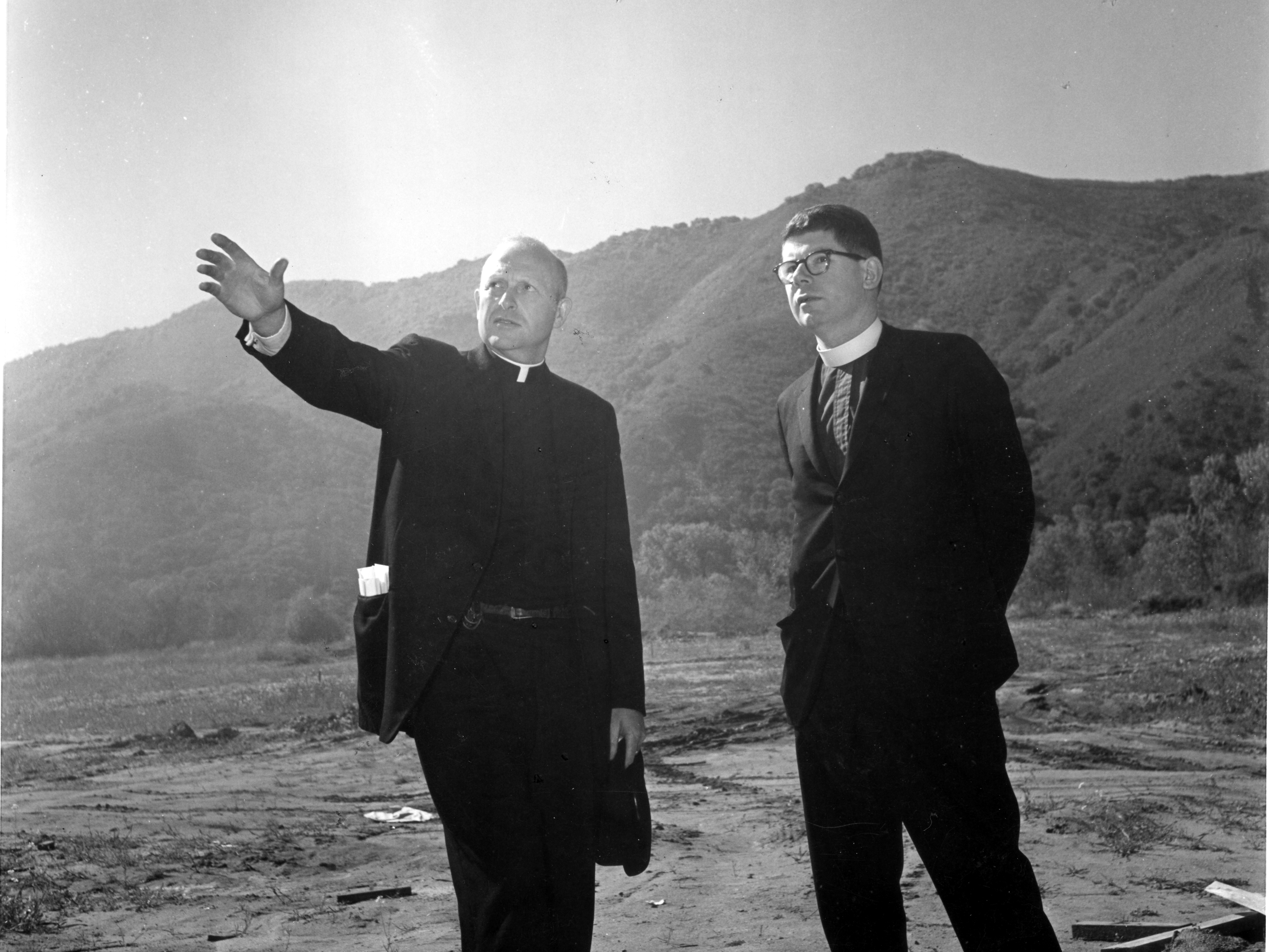
Reverends Peter Farmer and David Hill at the campus site before groundbreaking circa 1964

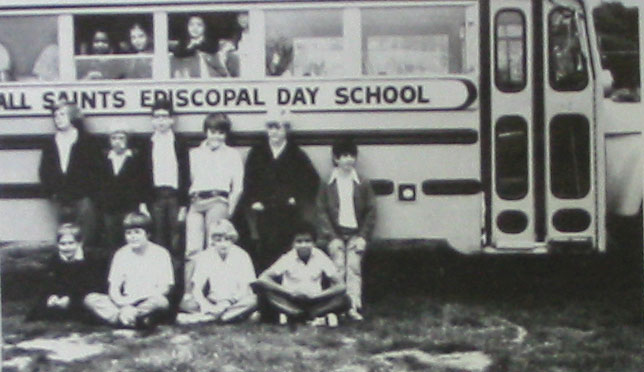
All Saints Episcopal Day School bus with students 1974

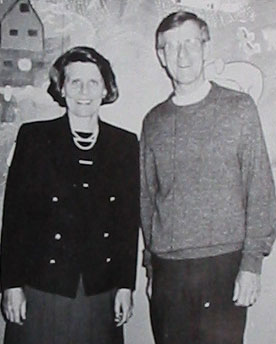
Mrs. Laurie Boone (Head of School) and Father Paul Danielson (School Chaplain), in 1989

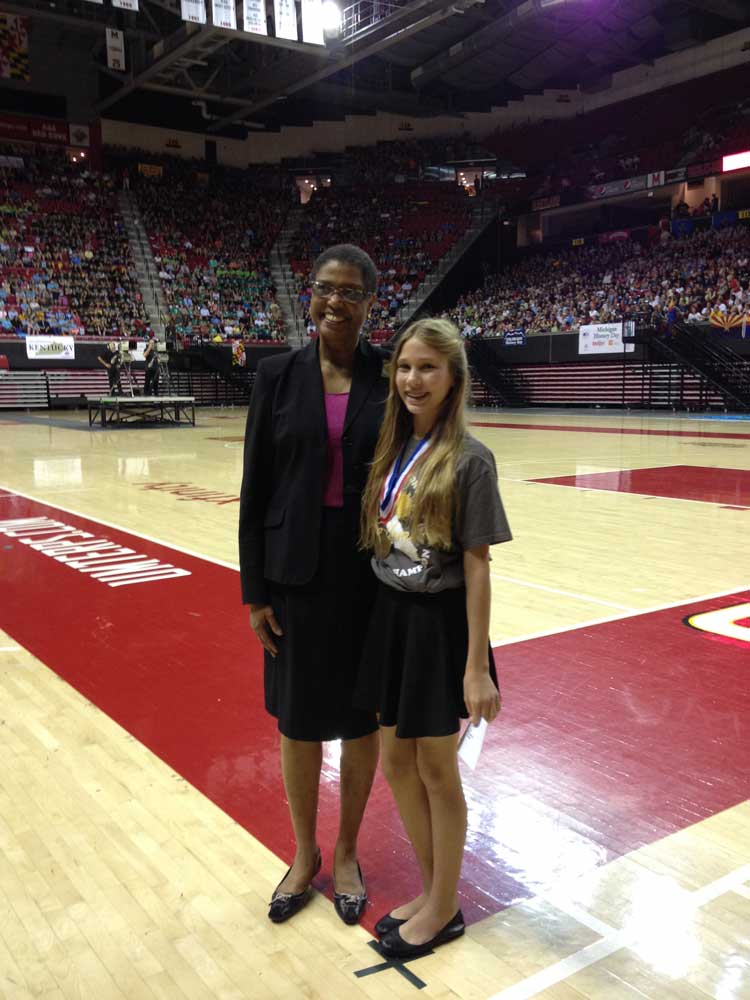
NHD 1st place junior division national winner, Molly Mancina, with Acting Chairman of the National Endowment for the Humanities (NEH), Carole Watson, 2014

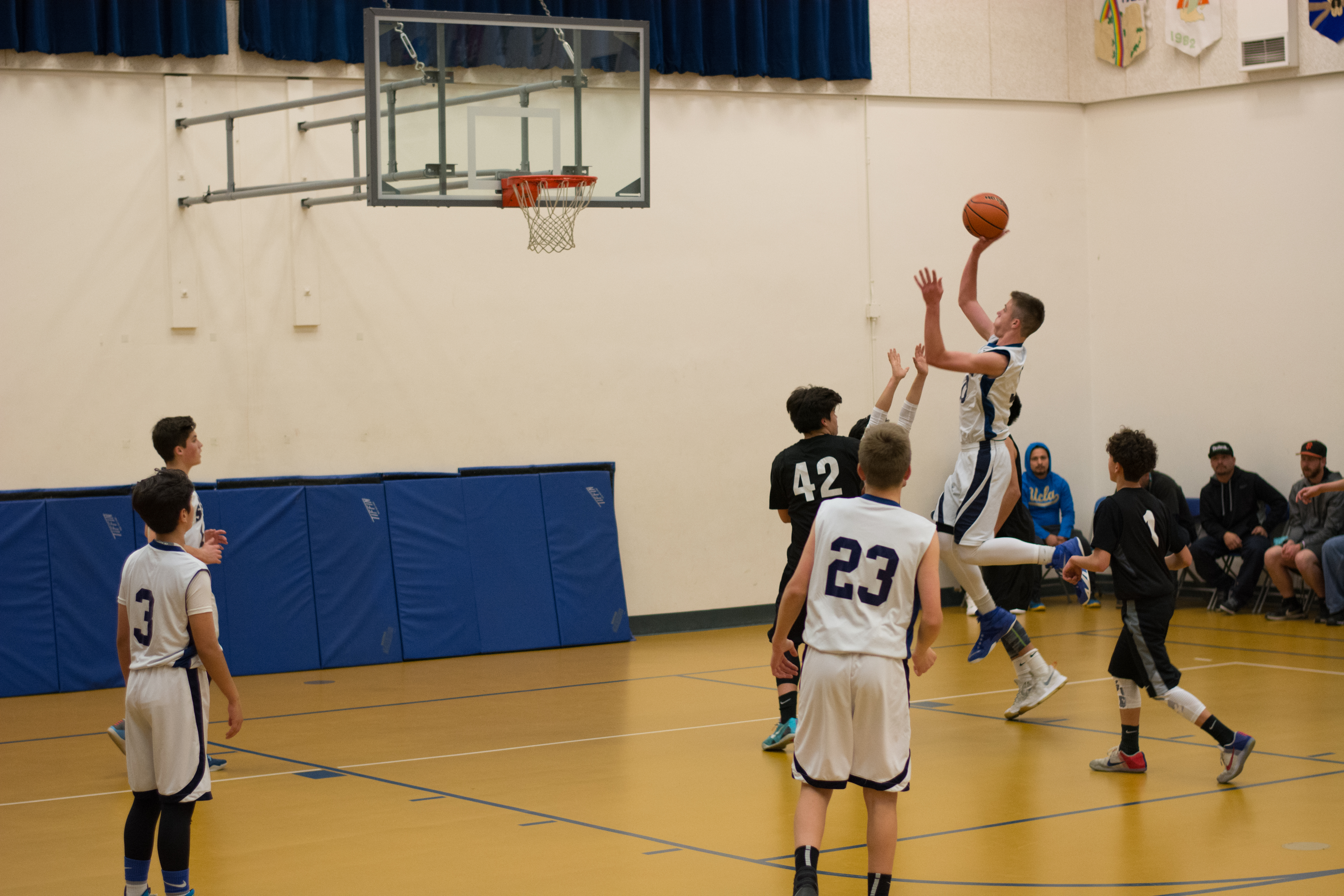
8th grader shooting

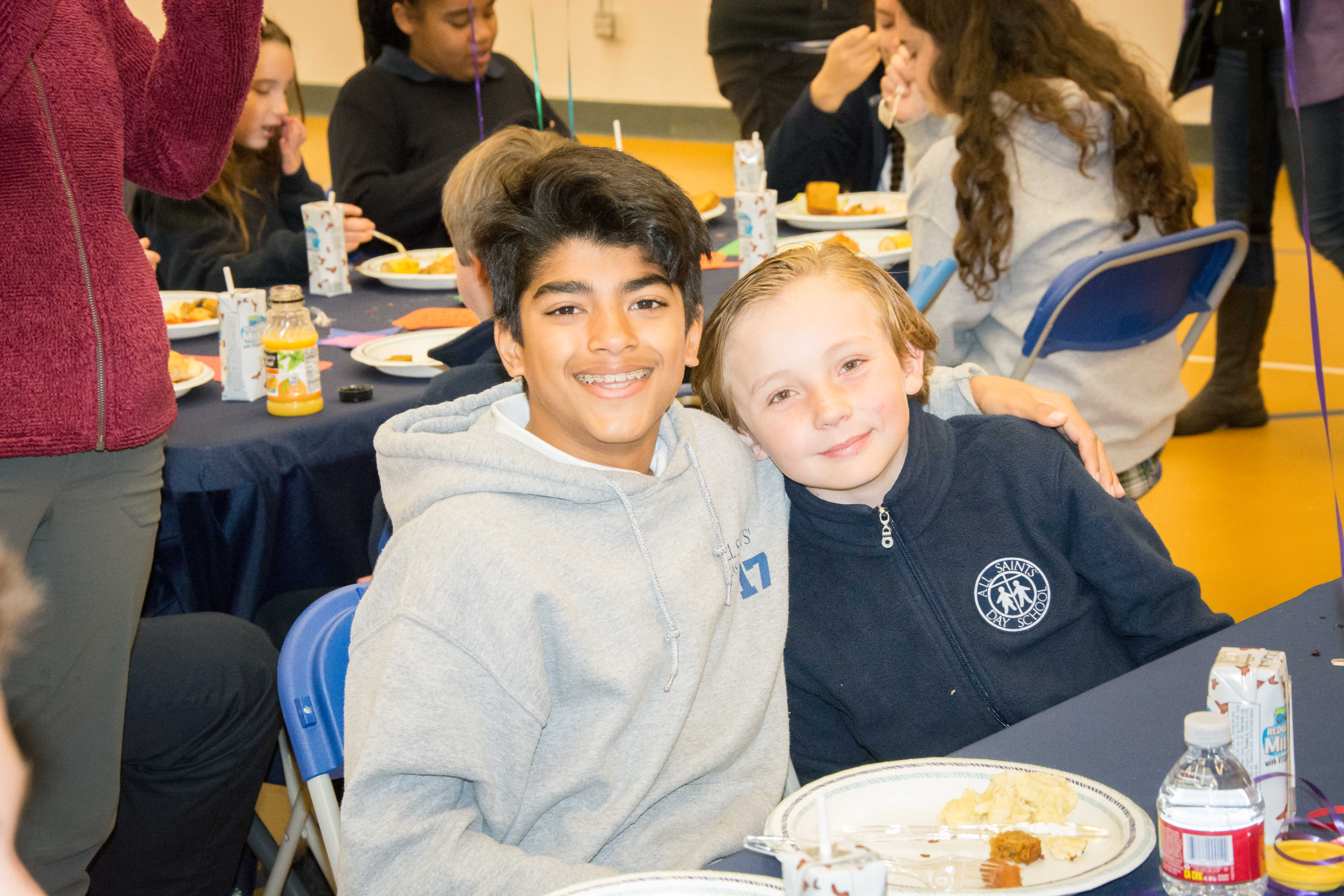
Big 'n Little Brothers & Sisters program

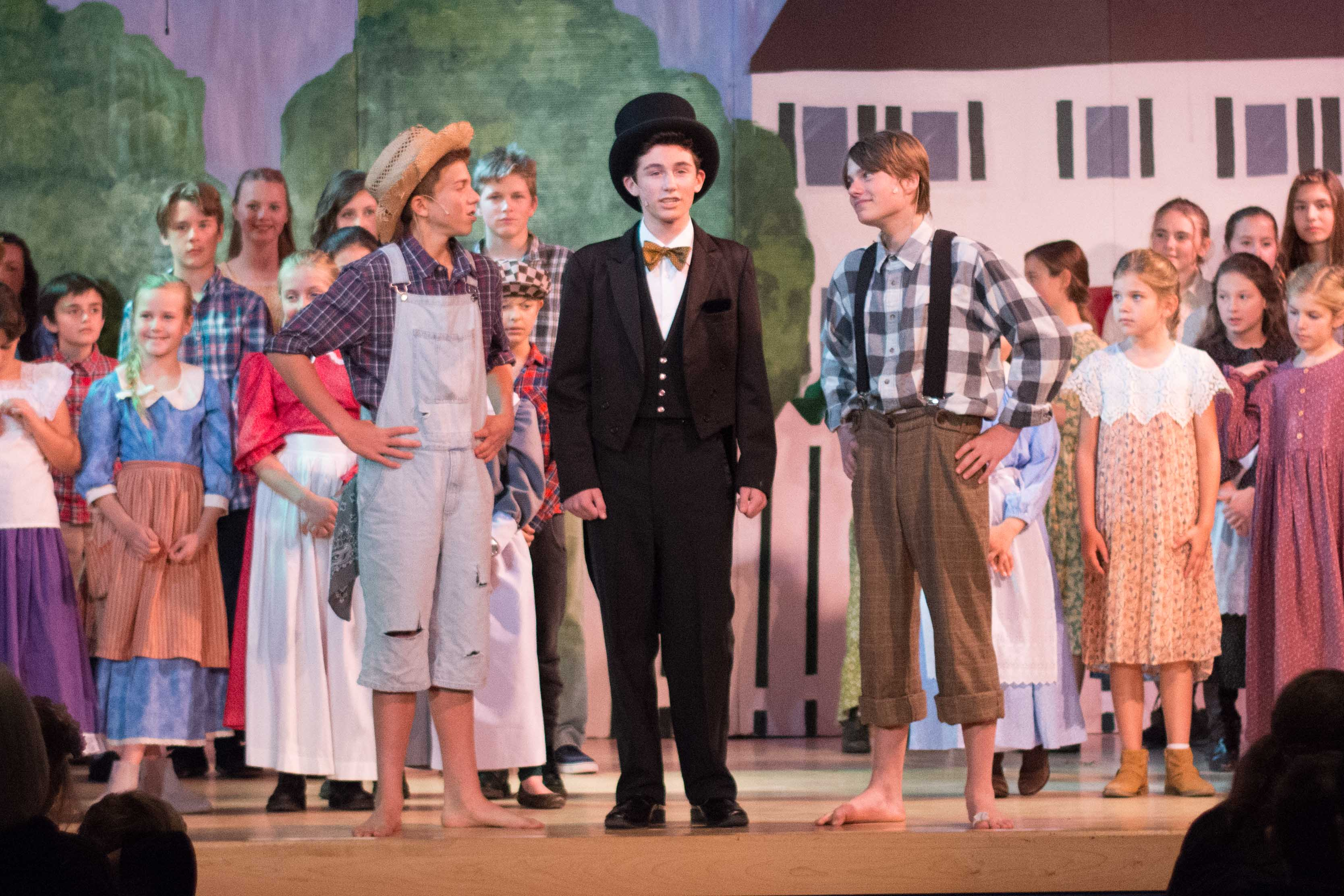
middle school production of Tom Sawyer 2017

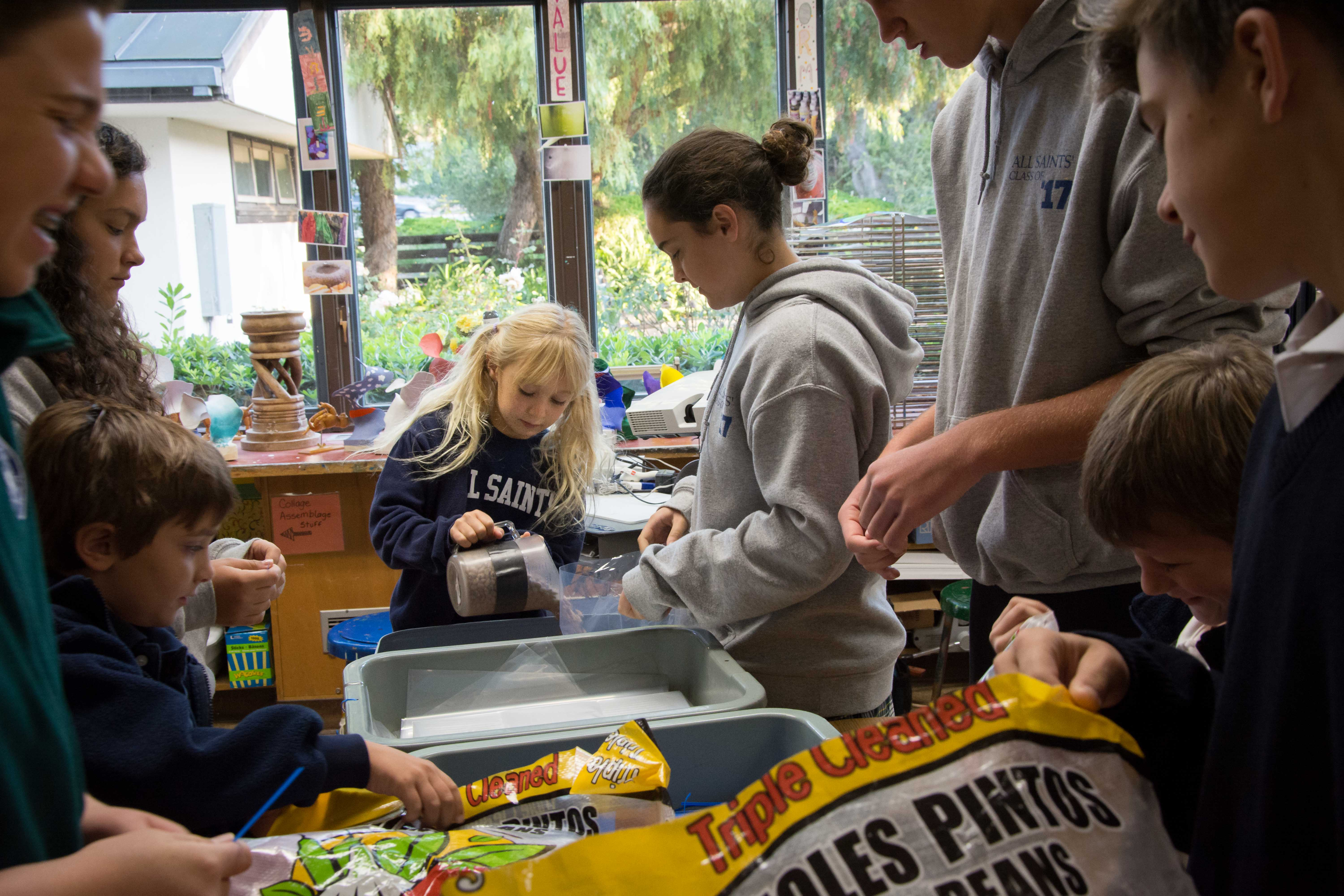
ASDS Students bagging beans for Nancy's Project, supporting Salinas Valley migrant farmworkers, 2016

After its first year in Pacific Grove in 1961, the school moved to temporary facilities in Carmel, California and changed its name to All Saints Episcopal Day School. Throughout that year, Reverend Peter Farmer shared his time between the school and his role as Vicar with St. Dunstan's church and the Santa Lucia Mission in Big Sur, California.

By 1962 Father Farmer was appointed full time Headmaster and left his role as Vicar of St. Dunstan's. The site where the school now resides in Carmel Valley opened for its first classes in 1965. Father Farmer and the sexton for All Saints' Church, Val Chaney, "spent the summer of 1965 finding and laying salvaged pipe for an irrigation system to water a playing field. They scavenged for desks and blackboards from the Department of Education Surplus Depot in San Leandro."

The school still consisted of one building with playing fields in 1970, but in 1975 ASDS completed construction of a gym, which also served as a multipurpose facility and auditorium for special events, and dedicated it as the William Russell Coats Memorial Hall.

In 1978 Mrs. Laurie Boone became Headmistress of All Saints Day School. By that time the school offered classes from Kindergarten through 8th grade, with 20 teachers and 173 students. In 1979 construction of the Maurine Church Coburn building to serve as the Early Childhood Unit was completed. In 1982, the original classroom building was remodeled and named in the honor of Reverend David Hill. Under the Coburn Trust, Maurine Church Coburn also gave the school its Performing Arts Building and a new Classroom wing, completed in 1983 and named in her honor. The Coburn Trust further purchased a neighboring plot of land and gifted it to the school.

By 1984 new landscaping had commenced along with work on new playing fields. There were 25 teachers and 201 students. Mrs. Laurie Boone Hogen retired as Head of School in 1995. Between 1995 and 2000 the school was served by Pro Tem Heads and administration, until Mrs. Linda Bradley who had been with the school for 22 years assumed the role of Head, until her retirement in 2002. In 2003, ASDS hired Mrs. Michele Rench as Head of School. Between then and her retirement in 2015, the school rebuilt the ECU and the multipurpose facility/gymnasium and added a teaching organic garden with a wood-burning bread-and-pizza oven. After hiring a governing board member of the California Association of Independent schools to serve as temporary head for one year, ASDS appointed Mr. Hugh Jebson as the new Head of School as of July 1, 2016. In the summer of 2018, Mr. Jebson announced his departure after the coming school year.

After a coordinated national search, narrowing the list to five candidates from around the country, ASDS chose the one from within the community, tapping Scott Fujita to become the new Head of School, commencing July 1, 2019. Scott Fujita served as Head of School from July 1, 2019, to June 30, 2024. As of July 1, 2024, Sara Brown is Head of School, and Fujita serves as chair of the board of trustees.

In the summer of 2017 the school commenced remodelling its 13,000+ volume library.

As of 2025, All Saints Day School serves preschool through 8th grade, with 258 students and 50 teachers.

== Education ==
According to the 2017 Accreditation Report by the California Association of Independent schools, which is a member of the National Association of Independent Schools, "An All Saints education has always been distinguished by the excellence of the academic program, the focus on service to the community, and the emphasis on the education of the whole child, as shown by the strong curricular and co-curricular offerings, including music, visual and performing arts, physical education, technology, and character education." The school's website specifies that it "welcomes students of all races, cultures, religions, and socio-economic backgrounds."

=== Recent Valedictorians ===
As of 2021, over the previous decade nine alumni of All Saints Day School have earned valedictorian honors in surrounding public and private high schools:
2011: Matthew Bruckman, Co-Valedictorian Stevenson School, graduate of Harvard University
2011: Claire Margolis, Co-Valedictorian Stevenson School, graduate of Stanford University School of Medicine
2012: Carolyn Bruckmann, Valedictorian Stevenson School, graduate of Harvard University
2016: Jillian Empey, Co-Valedictorian Carmel High School
2016: Emma Morgan, Valedictorian Stevenson School
2017: Madeleine Fontenay, Co-Valedictorian Carmel High School
2017: Matthew Luch, Co-Valedictorian Carmel High School
2018: Joe Johnsson, Co-Valedictorian Carmel High School
2021: Courtney Hand, Valedictorian York School (California)

=== National History Day and Student Achievements ===
Unique among schools in the region, all seventh grade students are required to participate in National History Day.

"National History Day, is a year-long educational program that encourages students to explore local, state, national, and world history. After selecting a historical topic that relates to an annual theme, students conduct extensive research by using libraries, archives, museums, and oral history interviews. They analyze and interpret their findings, draw conclusions about their topics' significance in history, and create final projects that present their work. These projects can be entered into a series of competitions, from the local to the national level, where they are evaluated by historians and educators."

According to the school's website and multiple reports in local newspapers and broadcasts (Monterey Herald, Carmel Pine Cone, Pacific Grove Cedar Street Times, Monterey County Weekly, KSBW), All Saints Day School students represent the school well by consistently winning high honors in local, regional, and national academic competitions, including Science Fair, National History Day, Mathletics, Math League, Foreign Language, Spelling Bees, and Writing.

=== Public Speaking & Performing Arts ===
Since the late 1970s the ASDS theater program has become a large part of student and community life. Younger students participate in what is called “Primary Players,” in which short skits are presented to the school and to parents. Older students up through 8th grade put on two large scale productions each year, a musical and a Shakespeare play. Students are encouraged to participate by trying out for parts, as stage crew, or playing an instrument in the live band. It is part of the school’s educational philosophy that graduates from All Saints’ have received steady practice and experience speaking in front of a large audience from their first year at the school.

=== Athletics ===
The school offers physical education utilizing two outdoor playing fields, paved courts, and a recently completed gymnasium and multi-purpose facility. School teams compete with other local schools. The boys basketball program won the MTJAL league championship in 2016 and came in second the following year in a "double overtime thriller."

On February 19, 2018, All Saints Day School alumnus, Brita Sigourney, won the Bronze Medal in the Women's Half-pipe freestyle skiing competition at the 2018 Winter Olympics in PyeongChang, South Korea. "I think I wanted it more this time. At my first Olympics, I just didn’t know what to expect, and I was just so happy to be there,” she said. “But this time, I really wanted it." Her father, Thad Sigourney, longtime ASDS Athletic Director, said after the event "I bit my tongue until blood came out of the corner of my mouth."

=== Character Education ===
==== Big 'n Little Brothers & Sisters Program ====
A long-standing practice at ASDS is to pair younger children with “big brothers and sisters” from the upper grades. Older students have the opportunity to role model and look out for their little brother or sister, while younger students have someone with relevant experience upon whom they can rely around campus. The school organizes events and activities such as Easter egg hunts in which the pairings get to interact and spend time with each other.

==== Community service ====
Several news reports reflect the school's efforts in local, national, and international community service through the years.
"All Saints students donate desks to fire victims. “The students at the private All Saints Episcopal Day School in Carmel Valley and the farmworkers of the Salinas Valley live in different worlds. But for a dozen years they’ve been linked. By beans." "All Saints School and Santa Catalina School got involved with student programs.”
“For 20 years an Episcopal school and parish in Carmel Valley have been helping an Episcopal school and parish in Hinche, Haiti, and despite the setbacks of natural disasters and revolution, the program is showing results.”
"It took 18 turkeys, 100 pounds of potatoes, 50 pounds of vegetables and almost 400 dinner rolls to provide the Seaside meal..."
The school defines community service for students as “giving their effort, willingly and freely, to an individual or organization that benefits from their help and/or improves the quality of life for the community.” The school website goes on to state “The Outreach program involves students at every age in school-wide projects and in service areas appropriate to each grade level.”

== Facilities ==
The Campus consists of 17 acres of flat land, adjacent to the Carmel River and surrounded by mountains leading to the Santa Lucia range. During biology sections, creative writing, and art excursions students have access to an on-campus stretch of the river with canyon views.
The lower grade wing of the school services grades one through five, along with separate dedicated classrooms for math, science, computers, and an oratory.
The upper grade wing holds the sixth through eighth grade classrooms and the foreign language department.
The school completed construction of its new Early Childhood Unit (ECU) building in 2011, as well as a gymnasium/multi-purpose facility for PE and sports, school wide assembly, and theater productions. Attached to this multi-purpose facility is a full service caterers kitchen.
There are 2 full sized athletic fields, over 80 computers for students and more than 13,000 volumes in the library, which has received a remodel and new construction during the summer of 2017.
ASDS owns the residence for the Head of School on adjacent land.
