= Soledad Bee =

Weekly newspaper in Soledad, California, U.S.

- Type: Weekly newspaper
- Owner(s): New SV Media
- Founder(s): Chester G. Kinnear
- Publisher: Jeanie Johnson
- Editor: Ryan Cronk
- Founded: 1909
- Language: English
- Headquarters: 522-B Broadway; King City, CA 93930
- Circulation: 1,050
- OCLC number: 33341989
- Website: soledadbee.com

The Soledad Bee is a weekly newspaper serving the town of Soledad, California and central Monterey County. The paper is owned by New SV Media, a subsidiary of Weeklys.

== History ==
In October 1909, the Soledad Bee was established by Chester G. Kinnear. He sold the paper in January 1909 to Emelio P. Giacomazzi. Kinnear stayed on to train the new owner and a month later was sued for libel for placing an advertisement mocking Maxwell Browne, who was a candidate for district attorney at the time.

In October 1916, E.P. Giacomazzi sold the Bee to his brother, Constantino "Con" Joseph Giacomazzi. Starting in 1917, the paper's owner served in the American Expeditionary Forces during World War I. He was part of the 91st Division and fought on the front-lines for four months in France and Belgium. While away, the Bee was managed by P.H. Smith. C.J. Giacomazzi was honorably discharged and returned to the paper in May 1919. He ran the paper until selling it to Ben F. Jacobson in 1947, and died a year later.

In 1967, Harry Casey, owner of the Greenfield News and King City Rustler, acquired the Soledad Bee from Jacobson. In 1981, Casey got into a dispute with Soledad police chief Dan Jiminez after his office adopted a practice of not releasing police blotter or police reports to the press. Instead, Jiminez's office began releasing "media reports" on cases it selects and after Casey complained, Jiminez threatened to start his own newspaper. In response, the California Newspaper Publishers Association reached out to lawmakers about changing the law.

In 1995, News Media Corporation purchased the Bee and its associated weekly papers from Casey. After 23 years of ownership, the company in 2019 sold the Bee, along with the King City Rustler, Greenfield News and Gonzales Tribune, to New SV Media group, which owned the Gilroy Dispatch, Morgan Hill Times and Hollister Free Lance.
