= Jackson Lloyd =

American football player

No. 77 – Alabama Crimson Tide
- Position: Offensive tackle
- Class: Sophomore

Personal information
- Listed height: 6 ft 7 in (2.01 m)
- Listed weight: 326 lb (148 kg)

Career information
- High school: Carmel (Carmel, California)
- College: Alabama (2025–present)

Jackson Lloyd is an American college football offensive tackle for the Alabama Crimson Tide.

== Early life ==
Lloyd is from Carmel, California. He attended Carmel High School where he competed in three sports and was a standout performer in football, basketball and baseball. In football, he was a two-way lineman and earned all-county honors three times from the Monterey Herald while also being selected to the All-American Bowl. Lloyd also led the basketball team several league championships and a sectional title, while winning a league title in baseball as well. He was ranked a five-star football prospect and one of the top 20 recruits nationally by On3.com. He committed to play college football for the Alabama Crimson Tide.

== College career ==
In his true freshman year at Alabama in 2025, Lloyd was a backup and appeared in five games. In 2026, as a sophomore, he was named the team's starting left tackle.
