= Mary Edna Burleigh Norton =

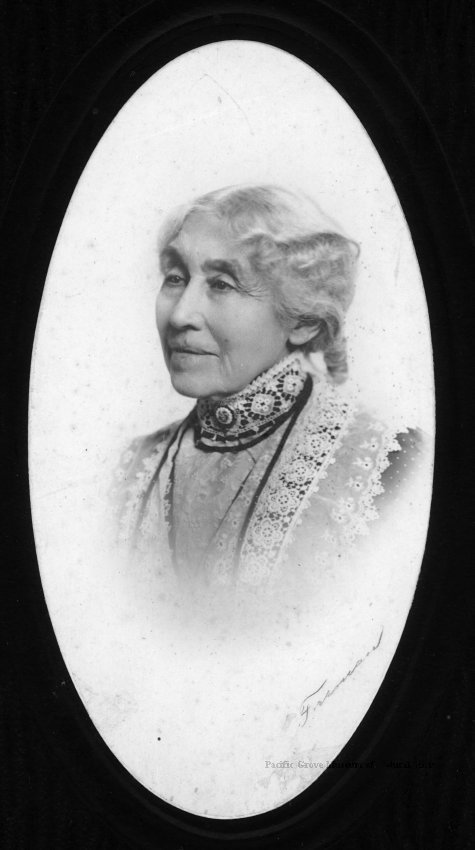
- Born: November 30, 1832; New York
- Died: February 13, 1917 (aged 84)

Signature
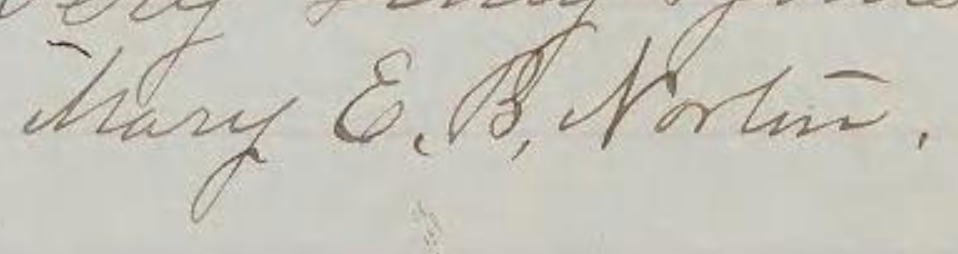

Mary Edna Burleigh Norton (November 30, 1832 – February 13, 1917) was an American professor, botanist, and museum curator.

== Early life and education ==
She was born on November 30, 1832, in New York as the elder sister of Henry Brace Norton. She attended Rockford Seminary in Illinois and in Berlin, Germany.

== Career ==
She taught botany and geography in public schools in the Midwest for 18 years In 1859, she became a professor at Rockford until 1875. In 1878, Mary became a professor at State Normal School at San Jose, California until her resignation in 1888. Her students gifted her a microscope which is in the Pacific Grove museum's collection. Mary Norton was curator of the Chautauqua Assembly's scientific collection, which was housed at Chautauqua Hall, the "old parlor" on Fountain Avenue, and the octagon museum. She was given an honorary master's degree from Rockford University in 1883. In 1886, she travelled to the Pacific Grove to teach botany to the Pacific Coast Branch of the Chautauqua Literary and Scientific Circle. in that region until her resignation in 1916. She collected 29 plant specimens throughout her career that are held by several institutions.
