= Pacific Grove High School =

School in California, United States

Location
- 615 Sunset Drive; Pacific Grove, California 93950; United States; 36.61034°N 121.92396°W

Information
- Type: Public
- Established: 1895
- School district: Pacific Grove Unified School District
- Staff: 35.87 (FTE)
- Grades: 9-12
- Enrollment: 547 (2022–23)
- Student to teacher ratio: 15.25
- Colors: Red and Gold
- Mascot: Billy the Breaker
- Rival: Carmel High School
- Website: PGHS

Pacific Grove High School (PGHS) is a public high school located in Pacific Grove, California, between Carmel and Monterey.

== History ==
Pacific Grove formed the Pacific Grove Unified School District in 1895. In June 1896, the City passed a bond issue to build the town's first structure, a morgue, which was then turned into a high school. Pacific Grove High School was Monterey County's first public high school, but today it is its smallest. The first class graduated in June 1898. The school has changed locations twice, first to what is now the Pacific Grove Middle School (PGMS), then to its current location on Sunset.

Pacific Grove shares a long-standing rivalry with Carmel High School, where every year the two football teams compete for a bronze shoe statue in the Shoe Game.

The baseball stadium was named "Don Curley Field" in 2003. A new artificial turf football stadium with an all-weather track was opened in 2009. The stadium project also yielded improvements to the multi-purpose room. An addition to the gym that was finished in 2012 yielded much improved locker room areas as well as a new dance room. The newly renovated swimming pool opened in January 2014.

== Notable alumni ==
- Gina Prince-Bythewood (Class of 1987), writer-director of television and motion pictures
- Rollo Peters (attended Freshman year), actor, director, and designer
