= Chris Prieto =

American baseball player (born 1972)

- Outfielder
- Born: August 24, 1972 (age 53); Carmel, California, U.S.
- Batted: Left Threw: Left

MLB debut
- May 14, 2005, for the Los Angeles Angels of Anaheim

Last MLB appearance
- May 16, 2005, for the Los Angeles Angels of Anaheim

MLB statistics
- Batting average: .000
- Home runs: 0
- Runs batted in: 0
- Stats at Baseball Reference

Teams
- As player: Los Angeles Angels of Anaheim (2005); As coach: Seattle Mariners (2017–2019); Tampa Bay Rays (2022–2023)

Christian Michael Prieto (born August 24, 1972) is an American former professional baseball player and coach who played one season in Major League Baseball for the Los Angeles Angels of Anaheim in 2005. Prieto attended Carmel High School, and the University of Nevada.

== Career ==
He was signed June 8, 1993 by San Diego Padres scout Don Lyle after being selected by the Padres in the 24th round of 1993 draft. Prieto was granted free agency, October 15, 1999, and subsequently signed by the Los Angeles Dodgers, January 20, 2000. After being signed by the Dodgers, he was loaned to the Mexico City Red Devils from July 18 – September 6, 2000. The Dodgers allowed him to go to free agency on October 15, 2001. Prieto was then signed by the Houston Astros on December 17, 2001, then released on April 29, 2002. The Oaxaca Guerreros signed him in May 2002, then he played for the independent Chico Outlaws starting in August 2002. The Oakland Athletics signed him on November 8, 2002, then was granted free agency, October 15, 2003. Signed by the St. Louis Cardinals January 7, 2004, then granted free agency, October 15, 2004. Finally, the Los Angeles Angels of Anaheim signed him as a free agent on December 14, 2004, and then released him on October 15, 2005.

Preito made two appearances with the Angels during the 2005 season. Manager Mike Scioscia noted at the time that Prieto would likely be used as a defensive replacement, or possibly as a situational hitter due to his bunting abilities. His first roster appearance was made on May 14, 2005, at Comerica Park against the Detroit Tigers. His final MLB appearance was made on May 16, 2005, at Jacobs Field against the Cleveland Indians.

== Coaching career ==
On October 24, 2021, Prieto was hired as the first base coach for the Tampa Bay Rays.

Sporting positions
Preceded by Scott Brosius	Seattle Mariners third base coach 2019	Succeeded by TBA
Preceded by Casey Candaele	Seattle Mariners first base coach 2017–2018	Succeeded by Perry Hill
