= Pacific Grove Unified School District =

School district in California, United States

Address
- 435 Hillcrest Avenue Pacific Grove, California, 93950; United States

District information
- Grades: K–12 and adult education
- Schools: 1 high school, 1 middle school, 3 elementary schools
- NCES District ID: 0629370

Students and staff
- Students: 1,899 (2020–2021)
- Teachers: 108.61 (FTE)
- Staff: 147.58 (FTE)
- Student–teacher ratio: 17.48:1

Other information
- Website: www.pgusd.org

Pacific Grove Unified School District is a public school district in Monterey County, California, United States. The school district was established in 1895.

The district includes Pacific Grove and a section of Del Monte Forest.

The District has five schools, including Pacific Grove High School.

== History ==
In 1884, Carrie Lloyd opened a summer school for children in the Chautauqua Hall. In 1885, the Pacific Grove School District was formed and classes were held in the Chautauqua Hall for several years, until the Methodist Episcopal Church and Assembly Hall was built on Lighthouse Avenue in 1888.
