= Amador Ledger-Dispatch =

Weekly newspaper published in Jackson, California

Ledger Dispatch
- Type: Weekly newspaper
- Owner: Jackson Rancheria Band of Miwuk Indians
- Founder(s): Thomas A. Springer; Edward B. Daingerfield
- Publisher: Jack Mitchell
- Editor: Jeremy Malamed
- Founded: 1855
- Language: English
- Headquarters: 106 Water Street; Jackson, CA 95642
- OCLC number: 741518013
- Website: ledger.news

The Amador Ledger-Dispatch is a weekly newspaper in Jackson, California. The paper covers news in Amador County and Calaveras County. It first published in 1855 and has been owned by the Jackson Rancheria Band of Miwuk Indians since 2016.

== History ==
=== Amador Ledger ===
On October 27, 1855, the first edition of the Volcano Weekly Ledger was published by Thomas A. Springer and Edward B. Daingerfield in Volcano, California. After 18 months, Springer relocated the paper to Jackson and relaunched it as The Weekly Ledger on April 18, 1857. The name was changed again to the Amador Weekly Ledger on October 24, 1857. Springer was elected state printer in 1871 and he retired from the paper. He then leased it to Robert M. Briggs and Grant H. Springer. In 1873, Briggs and John A. Eagan bought the Ledger from Springer.

In 1875, Richard Webb, a newsman who grew up in Australia and graduated from the Congregational College of Victoria, bought a half-interest in the paper and soon became the sole proprietor. Webb was formerly connected with the Sutter Creek Independent. In the 1881 book "History of Amador County," author J.D. Mason wrote that Webb wielded "a sarcastic pen, and frequently got into personal difficulties and occasionally a libel suit through his unsparing denunciations. Webb sold the paper in 1892 to William A. Newsum and H.N. Calkins. In 1894, Webb started another paper called the Amador Republican. In 1900, the Amador County Publishing Company, owned by Webb, acquired the Ledger from Newsum and then discontinued the Republican.

Webb died in April 1915. His estate sold the Ledger that September to Oran Achilles King, former owner of the Walnut Creek Courier. King leased the paper in 1923 to William C. Copeman. Copeman eventually acquired ownership and leased the paper in 1931 to Romauld "Bud" Huberty and Ambrose "Babe" Garbarini. The two men acquired ownership in 1934 and operated the Ledger for decades. In 1968, the E Clampus Vitus held a parade and dedicated a bronze plaque to commemorate the paper. In 1977, Mike and Pam Bohl, owners of the Amador Progress News, acquired the Ledger from Garbarini. At that time the Ledger was the fourth oldest weekly paper in the state and had a circulation of 2,700. Garbarini continued to write for the paper on a typesetting machine and penned a column called "As We Think About it."

=== Amador Dispatch ===
On March 3, 1860, the Lancha Plana Dispatch was first published in Lancha Plana, California. By that November, it was moved to Jackson and renamed to the Amador Dispatch. The paper was founded by George M. Payne, who sold it in July 1863 to Giles C. Crandall. It was a Copperhead paper, Democratic affiliated, and supported Southern secession. The paper soon came under the ownership of Lovick P. "Long Primer" Hall and William H. Penry. Penry previously co-founded and owned The Folsom Telegraph. Hall previously ran a paper in Visalia with Samuel J. Garrison called Equal Rights Expositor. The paper was suppressed in 1863 and Hall was arrested. He was released from Camp Babbitt after taking an oath of allegiance. After the assassination of Abraham Lincoln in April 1865, the Dispatch was suppressed for expressing pleasure over the death of the president. Hall and Penry were arrested and incarcerated at Fort Alcatraz for more than a month.

By September 1865, H.H. Hartley had revived the Dispatch. Penry resumed ownership in 1868. Five years later Penry's brother, Silas Penry, was attacked by Elisha Turner and shot him in self-defense. The brawl stemmed from political articles Penry published in Dispatch and those Turner wrote for the Amador Ledger. In 1896, Penry leased the paper to Edwin C. Rust, formerly of the Winters Express. William M. Penry Jr. took over editorship at some point. His father W.M. Penry Sr. died in 1921. The Penry family continued to own the paper until 1927, when the Dispatch went into receivership and was sold at auction. The new owners were G.D. Beardslee and Warren E. Read. Read co-edited the paper with his daughter Betty Read and published it until his death in 1948. Betty Read continued to operate the Dispatch and in 1950 married Lazo Curilich, who became co-publisher. The couple sold the paper in 1963 to W. Stanley Barker, owner of Placerville Mountain Democrat.

In 1965, Barker sold the paper to Harvey C. and Helen M. McGee, who owned The Union Democrat. At that time editor and publisher Daniel J. Barnett was made a co-owner. Two years later the owners entered talks to merge the Dispatch with the Calaveras Enterprise, but a deal never materialized. In 1975, sheriff's deputies placed a padlock on the pressroom due to a civil case. The press equipment Barnett bought from Mack Hardison was reposed after he lost the case and owed $69,000. Printing of the Dispatch was moved to another press until a deal as reached.

=== Ledger-Dispatch ===
In 1978, Daniel J. Barnett and Michael C. Bohl merged their businesses together to form Goldweb Publications. In April 1989, McClatchy Newspapers, publishers of the Sacramento Bee, bought four papers from Goldweb. The sale included the Amador Ledger, Amador Dispatch, Amador Progress-News and Amador Advertiser. At that time the papers had a combined circulation of 5,100. The Ledger and Dispatch were then merged to form the Ledger-Dispatch on June 7, 1989. In 1997, McClatchy sold the Ledger-Dispatch, along with the Hollister Free Lance, Morgan Hill Times and Gilroy Dispatch, to Central Valley Publishing, which was managed by USMedia Group, Inc., of Crystal City, Missouri. The company's name was changed a few years later to Pacific Sierra Publishing Company. In 2004, Mainstreet Media Group purchased ten publications from Pacific Sierra, including the Ledger-Dispatch.

In 2013, Tami Tran, a Bay Area media investor, bought the paper. Much of the newsroom staff left in the years that followed. Some were hired by the Jackson Rancheria Band of Miwuk Indians, owners of the Jackson Rancheria Casino Resort, to launch a news site called Acorn News, which was short for Amador & Calaveras Objective Regional News. A few weeks after the site's launch in 2016, the tribe bought the Ledger-Dispatch for $1 million. The business was then folded into Acorn News.
