= Del Monte Forest, California =

Del Monte Forest
- Census-designated place
- Location in Monterey County and the state of California

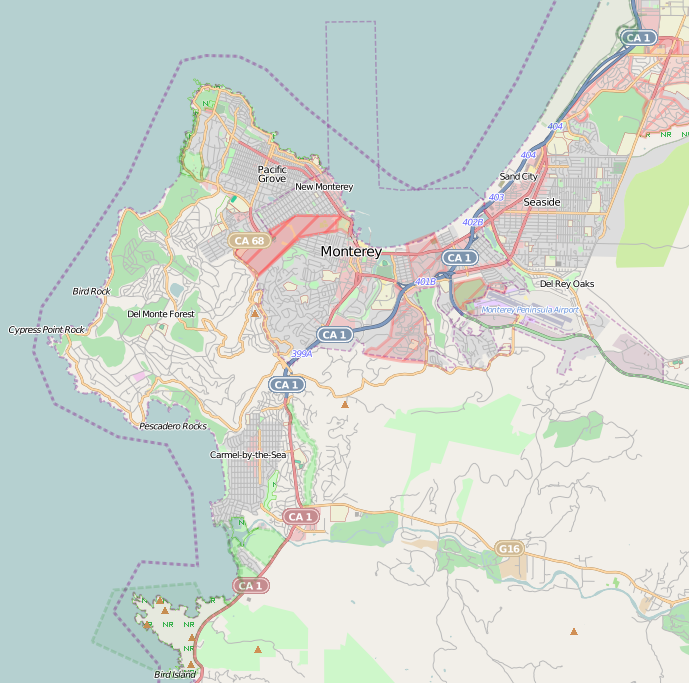
- Location in the United States
- Coordinates: 36°35′11″N 121°56′51″W
- Country: United States
- State: California
- County: Monterey

Government
  - State senator: John Laird (D)
  - Assemblymember: Dawn Addis (D)
  - U. S. rep.: Jimmy Panetta (D)

Area
  - Total: 10.64 sq mi (27.55 km^{2})
  - Land: 8.03 sq mi (20.79 km^{2})
  - Water: 2.61 sq mi (6.77 km^{2}) 24.54%
- Elevation: 207 ft (63 m)

Population (2020)
  - Total: 4,204
  - Density: 523.8/sq mi (202.23/km^{2})
- Time zone: UTC-8 (PST)
  - Summer (DST): UTC-7 (PDT)
- ZIP code: 93953 (Pebble Beach)
- Area code: 831
- FIPS code: 06-18590
- GNIS feature ID: 1867013

Del Monte Forest (Del Monte, Spanish for "of the mountain") is a census-designated place (CDP) in Monterey County, California, United States. As of the 2020 census, the CDP had a total population of 4,204, down from 4,514 at the 2010 census. The census area includes the separate well-known community of Pebble Beach.

The Del Monte Forest is a habitat area of the same location, which originally occupied considerably more area prior to urban development of the 20th century. The forest is dominated by Monterey pine, but also contains other important tree species and a variety of rare and endangered plant species.

== Geography and ecology ==
Del Monte Forest is located in northwestern Monterey County at 36°35'11" North, 121°56'51" West. It occupies the western half of the Monterey Peninsula and is bordered to the east by the city of Monterey and to the north by the city of Pacific Grove. The city of Carmel-by-the-Sea is to the south. Pebble Beach is in the southern part of the CDP.

According to the United States Census Bureau, Del Monte Forest has a total area of 10.6 square miles (27 km^{2}), of which 8.0 square miles (21 km^{2}) are land and 2.6 square miles (6.7 km^{2}) are water. The total area is 24.55% water.

The community is a habitat for a number of limited range and endangered species.

== History ==
The Del Monte Forest was originally part of the resort complex of the Hotel Del Monte in Monterey. The resort hotel was built by Charles Crocker, one of California's Big Four railroad barons, through Southern Pacific Railroad's property division, the Pacific Improvement Company (PIC). The hotel first opened on June 10, 1880. Samuel Finley Brown Morse formed the Del Monte Properties Company on February 27, 1919, and acquired the extensive holdings of the PIC, which included the Del Monte Forest, the Del Monte Lodge (since renamed the Lodge at Pebble Beach) and the Hotel Del Monte. The actual hotel building and surrounding grounds were acquired by the United States Navy after World War II to be the Navy's new location of the Naval Postgraduate School.

== Demographics ==
Historical population
| Census | Pop. | Note | %± |
|---|---|---|---|
| 1990 | 5,069 | | — |
| 2000 | 4,531 | | −10.6% |
| 2010 | 4,514 | | −0.4% |
| 2020 | 4,204 | | −6.9% |
U.S. Decennial Census; 1990 2000 2010

=== 2020 census ===
As of the 2020 census, Del Monte Forest had a population of 4,204. The population density was 523.8 inhabitants per square mile (202.2/km^{2}). The median age was 60.0 years. 15.6% of residents were under the age of 18 and 41.6% were 65 years of age or older. The age distribution was 6.1% aged 18 to 24, 10.9% aged 25 to 44, and 25.8% aged 45 to 64. For every 100 females there were 92.4 males, and for every 100 females age 18 and over there were 91.0 males age 18 and over.

The census reported that 91.0% of the population lived in households, 7.6% lived in non-institutionalized group quarters, and 1.5% were institutionalized. 97.8% of residents lived in urban areas, while 2.2% lived in rural areas.

There were 1,749 households, of which 15.3% had children under the age of 18 living in them. Of all households, 60.8% were married-couple households, 3.5% were cohabiting couple households, 11.9% were households with a male householder and no spouse or partner present, and 23.7% were households with a female householder and no spouse or partner present. About 23.8% of all households were made up of individuals and 16.9% had someone living alone who was 65 years of age or older. The average household size was 2.19. There were 1,245 families (71.2% of all households).

There were 2,801 housing units, of which 37.6% were vacant. The homeowner vacancy rate was 2.6% and the rental vacancy rate was 12.8%. Of occupied units, 84.0% were owner-occupied and 16.0% were occupied by renters.

Racial composition as of the 2020 census
| Race | Number | Percent |
|---|---|---|
| White | 3,320 | 79.0% |
| Black or African American | 39 | 0.9% |
| American Indian and Alaska Native | 6 | 0.1% |
| Asian | 426 | 10.1% |
| Native Hawaiian and Other Pacific Islander | 10 | 0.2% |
| Some other race | 54 | 1.3% |
| Two or more races | 349 | 8.3% |
| Hispanic or Latino (of any race) | 241 | 5.7% |

=== Income and poverty ===
In 2023, the US Census Bureau estimated that the median household income was $154,730, and the per capita income was $128,746. About 3.9% of families and 5.5% of the population were below the poverty line.

== Government ==
At the county level, Del Monte Forest is represented on the Monterey County Board of Supervisors by Supervisor Kate Daniels.

In the California State Legislature, Del Monte Forest is in the 17th senatorial district, represented by Democrat John Laird, and in the 30th Assembly district, represented by Democrat Dawn Addis.

In the United States House of Representatives, Del Monte Forest is in California's 19th congressional district, represented by Democrat Jimmy Panetta.

== Education ==
Portions of the CDP are in the Carmel Unified School District, Monterey Peninsula Unified School District, and Pacific Grove Unified School District.

The respective high school of the first district is Carmel High School.

== Environmental features ==
The Monterey pine forest is habitat to numerous rare and endangered species including Hickman's potentilla and Yadon's piperia, both of which are federally protected species.

== See also ==
- Cypress forest
