= Scott Fujita =

American football player (born 1979)

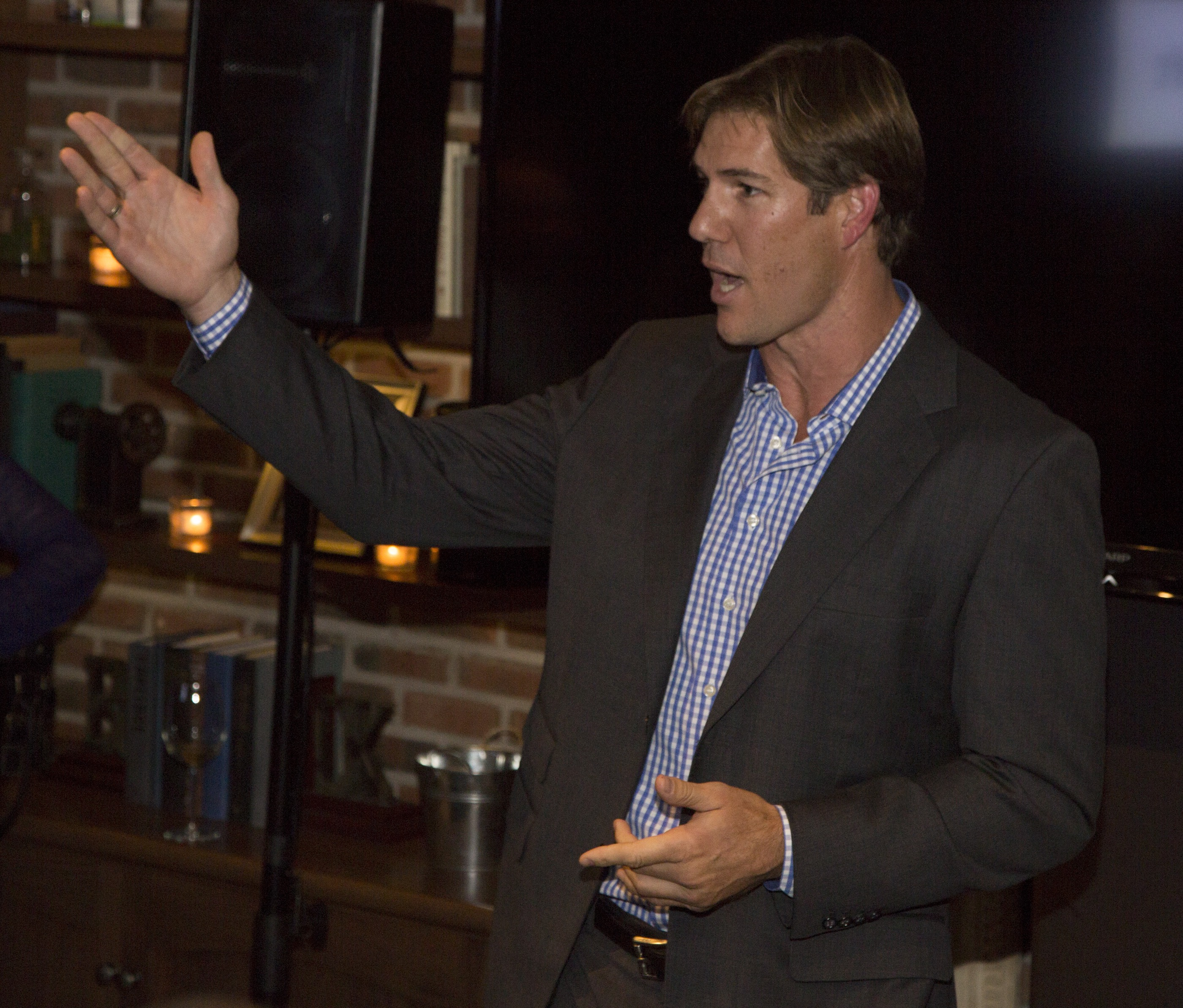
- Fujita speaking at an event in 2014

No. 51, 50, 55, 99
- Position: Linebacker

Personal information
- Born: April 28, 1979 (age 47); Ventura, California, U.S.
- Listed height: 6 ft 5 in (1.96 m)
- Listed weight: 250 lb (113 kg)

Career information
- High school: Rio Mesa (Oxnard, California)
- College: California (1997–2001)
- NFL draft: 2002: 5th round, 143rd overall pick

Career history
- Kansas City Chiefs (2002–2004); Dallas Cowboys (2005); New Orleans Saints (2006–2009); Cleveland Browns (2010–2012)

Awards and highlights
- Super Bowl champion (XLIV); PFWA All-Rookie Team (2002)

Career NFL statistics
- Games played: 143
- Total tackles: 942
- Sacks: 23.5
- Forced fumbles: 11
- Fumble recoveries: 3
- Interceptions: 7
- Stats at Pro Football Reference

Scott Anthony Fujita (/fuːˈdʒiːtə/; born April 28, 1979) is an American former professional football player who was a linebacker for 11 seasons in the National Football League (NFL). He played college football for the California Golden Bears. He was selected by the Kansas City Chiefs in the 2002 NFL draft. He played in the NFL for the Chiefs, Dallas Cowboys, New Orleans Saints, and Cleveland Browns. He was a member of the 2009 Saints team that won Super Bowl XLIV, defeating the Indianapolis Colts.

== Early life ==
Scott Fujita was adopted as an infant by Rodney Fujita, who is a third-generation Japanese-American, and his wife Helen, who is half-white.

He attended Rio Mesa High School in Oxnard, California. In football, he was a two-way player at safety and tight end; during his senior season in 1996 he tallied 118 tackles, 4 sacks, 5 interceptions, 15 receptions for 350 yards and 6 touchdowns. He also lettered in basketball and in track and field, competing in the 400 meters, long jump, and triple jump. Fujita received first-team all-Channel League and all-Ventura County honors in both football and basketball. He earned Defensive MVP honors in the Ventura County All-Star football game, and won the half-time slam dunk contest at the Ventura County All-Star basketball game.

== College career and education ==
Fujita walked on at the University of California, Berkeley in 1997. As a redshirt freshman in 1998, he was converted from a safety into an outside linebacker, playing mostly on special teams and collecting 8 defensive tackles as a backup.

As a sophomore in 1999, he made his first 2 starts, making 15 tackles. During the spring of 2000, Fujita underwent career-threatening neck surgery.

As a junior in 2000, he started 11 games, making 41 tackles (13 for loss) and 4 sacks. As a senior in 2001, he started 11 games, posting 60 tackles, 2.5 sacks and 2 forced fumbles. He finished his college career after appearing in 39 games with 24 starts, while registering 124 tackles, 7 sacks, 2 forced fumbles and one fumble recovery.

Fujita was a Verizon District VIII Academic All-American and a two-time 1st team All-Academic Pac-10 selection.

Fujita graduated with honors in Political Science and a minor degree in Business Administration in 2001, and earned a Masters degree in Education in 2002.

== Professional career ==
=== NFL Combine ===
Pre-draft measurables
Height	Weight	Arm length	Hand span	40-yard dash	10-yard split	20-yard split	20-yard shuttle	Three-cone drill	Vertical jump	Broad jump	Bench press
6 ft 5 1/2 in (1.97 m)	248 lb (112 kg)	33 in (0.84 m)	10 in (0.25 m)	4.61 s	1.57 s	2.65 s	4.21 s	7.09 s	42.0 in (1.07 m)	10 ft 2 in (3.10 m)	20 reps
All values from NFL Combine

=== Kansas City Chiefs ===
Fujita was selected by the Kansas City Chiefs in the fifth round (143rd) of the 2002 NFL draft. As a rookie, he started 9 of 16 games, recording 63 tackles, 6 passes defensed, one sack and 15 special teams tackles (tied for second on the team). He was subsequently awarded the Mack Lee Hill Award as Chiefs' rookie of the year and named to the PFWA NFL All-Rookie Team.

In 2003, he started all 16 games and led the team with 151 tackles (fifth most in club history), while also registering 4 sacks, 6 passes defensed, one forced fumble and one interception. In 2004, he posted 112 tackles, 4.5 sacks and 3 passes defensed.

Fujita underwent offseason ankle surgery in the spring of 2005 and was traded to the Dallas Cowboys before the start of the 2005 season.

=== Dallas Cowboys ===
In the 2005 season, he played in 16 games, recording 58 tackles, 2 sacks, one pass defensed, 2 forced fumbles and 9 special teams tackles. His sack and forced fumble of former Chiefs teammate Trent Green was a turning point in the Cowboys win against Kansas City. He was declared a free agent at the end of the season.

=== New Orleans Saints ===
On March 13, 2006, he signed with the New Orleans Saints, reuniting with former Dallas Cowboys offensive coordinator, now head coach Sean Payton. He was the first free agent to join the Saints when they returned to New Orleans after their year-long absence in the aftermath of Hurricane Katrina. In his first year with the Saints in 2006, Fujita led the team in tackles on their way to a NFC South Division Championship. He was named the NFL's Defensive Player of the Week after his performance against the Atlanta Falcons on Monday Night Football on September 25, 2006, which signified the Saints return to the Superdome following Hurricane Katrina.

Fujita was named defensive captain at the start of the 2007 season. In Week 1 of the 2008 season, Fujita caught a crucial game-winning interception in the closing seconds of the Saints win against the Tampa Bay Buccaneers. In the 2009 season, he earned a Super Bowl ring as a member of the Saints team that won Super Bowl XLIV on February 7, 2010, defeating the Indianapolis Colts 31–17 to win the team's first NFL championship.

=== Cleveland Browns ===
Fujita was a free agent after the 2009 season, and on March 7, 2010, he signed a contract with the Cleveland Browns, who coveted his leadership qualities. In September, he was elected one of the Browns' defensive captains for the 2010 season. Through nine games, Fujita was second on the team in tackles and sacks, but he was injured in a November 14 game against the New York Jets and missed the remainder of the season. Fujita was among the team's leaders in tackles during the 2011 season when he was placed on the injured reserve list with a fractured hand he suffered in the eleventh game against the Cincinnati Bengals. In the 2012 season after the Week 6 game against the New York Giants, Fujita was placed on injured reserve with a career-ending neck injury on October 24.

=== Saints "bounty" scandal ===
Fujita was suspended by the NFL for the first 3 games of the 2012 season because of his alleged participation in the Saints' so-called "bounty" scandal. On September 7, his suspension was lifted. On October 9, 2012, four weeks and three days after an internal appeals panel vacated suspensions imposed on Fujita, Saints linebacker Jonathan Vilma, Saints defensive end Will Smith, and free-agent defensive end Anthony Hargrove, the league re-issued the discipline, with reductions to the suspensions of Fujita and Hargrove. Vilma's suspension remained a full season, Smith's remained four games, Hargrove's reduced from eight games to seven, and Fujita's suspension was reduced from three games to one when NFL Commissioner Roger Goodell declared Fujita did not contribute to a so-called "bounty" pool.

Fujita issued the following statement following the Commissioner's ruling: "I'm pleased the commissioner has finally acknowledged that I never participated in any so-called 'bounty' program, as I've said for the past seven months. However, his condescending tone was neither accurate nor productive. Additionally, I am now purportedly being suspended for failing to confront my former defensive coordinator for his inappropriate use of language. This seems like an extremely desperate attempt to punish me. I also think it sets a bad precedent when players can be disciplined for not challenging the behavior of their superiors. This is an absolute abuse of the power that's been afforded to the commissioner. For me, the issue of player health and safety is personal. For the league and the commissioner, it's about perception and liability. The commissioner says he is disappointed in me. The truth is, I’m disappointed in him. His positions on player health and safety since a 2009 congressional hearing on concussions have been inconsistent at best. He failed to acknowledge a link between concussions and post-career brain disease, pushed for an 18-game regular season, committed to a full season of Thursday night games, has continually challenged players' rights to file workers compensation claims for on-the-job injuries, and he employed incompetent replacement officials for the start of the 2012 season. His actions or lack thereof are by the league’s own definition, 'conduct detrimental.' My track record on the issue of player health and safety speaks for itself. And clearly, as I just listed, the commissioner's does, too."

On December 11, 2012, it was announced that former commissioner Paul Tagliabue exonerated Fujita of all culpability and wrongdoing in the Saints pay-for-play scandal, vacating his suspension and clearing his record.

=== NFL Players Association ===
Fujita served as Vice President of the NFL Players Association and represented the players union during negotiations with NFL league management during the 2010-2011 labor dispute and NFL lockout. He also joined fellow union executive committee member Drew Brees in calling on the NFL to end the lockout of referees.

=== Retirement from football ===
On April 22, 2013, Fujita signed a one-day contract with the New Orleans Saints while sitting atop Machu Picchu in Peru with his former teammate Steve Gleason, announcing his retirement immediately after with a mock press conference above Machu Picchu. The Team Gleason expedition was accompanied by an NFL Films crew who produced a documentary film as part of its "A Football Life" series.

=== NFL statistics ===
Year	Team	Games	Total Tackles	Assisted Tackles	Special Teams Tackles	Sacks	Forced Fumbles	Fumble Recoveries	Interceptions
2002	KC	16	78	14	15	1.0	0	1	0
2003	KC	16	151	41	0	4.0	1	0	1
2004	KC	16	113	41	1	4.5	0	0	0
2005	DAL	16	67	15	9	2.0	2	0	0
2006	NO	16	119	44	0	3.5	1	0	2
2007	NO	15	119	40	0	3.0	2	2	0
2008	NO	14	104	46	1	0.0	1	0	2
2009	NO	11	75	26	0	1.0	2	0	0
2010	CLE	9	51	15	0	3.5	2	0	1
2011	CLE	10	51	37	0	0.0	0	0	1
2012	CLE	4	14	4	0	1.0	0	0	0
Career		143	942	323	26	23.5	11	3	7

== Post-football career ==
=== Media and entertainment ===
In August 2013, Fujita joined the new Fox Sports 1 sports network as an analyst on its Fox Football Daily program. He was also a regular contributing writer to Fox Sports' digital platforms, including columns detailing the "emotional infancy" defining NFL cut day, as well as a humorous take on the Cleveland Browns drafting of Johnny Manziel in 2014.

Fujita co-hosted the Fox Sports podcast series "Unconventional Wisdom" with retired NFL player Brendon Ayanbadejo and retired MLB baseball player Gabe Kapler.

Fujita wrote a series of columns for The New York Times in 2013-14, including essays about marriage equality and the complexities surrounding the NFL's concussion settlement.

Fujita served as a producer on the award-winning documentary film, Gleason, which premiered at the Sundance Film Festival in 2016 and opened in theaters that summer.

=== Career as an educator ===
In 2018 Fujita became the athletic director of All Saints Day School, in Carmel, California at which point he added flag football, cross country, and track and field to the school's athletic offerings. On January 30, 2019, the school announced Fujita as its Head of School. Fujita transitioned into the role of Chair of the school board following the 2024 school year.

== Japanese-American family history ==
Fujita's father, Rodney, was born at the Gila River War Relocation Center in Phoenix, Arizona where his father Nagao, a 442nd Infantry Regiment combat veteran who later became an attorney, was one of many Japanese-Americans whose family was interned during World War II. Fujita grew up in a traditional Japanese household, celebrating Japanese festivals and holidays, and considers himself "half-Japanese at heart". In 2006, Fujita's family story was detailed in the ESPN Magazine feature, Hello, I'm Japanese.

While serving as a Head of School, Fujita hosted an electronic field trip for the National World War II Museum in New Orleans to illustrate the experiences of Japanese Americans during the war.

In 2024, Fujita was featured in the NFL Films documentary film, Scott Fujita: Fear, Football and the Theft of Freedom, which was filmed at the Heart Mountain internment camp in Wyoming.

== Personal life ==
Fujita is married with three children and lives in Carmel Valley, California. During his playing career, he went on record as a supporter of marriage equality and served as an advocate for adoption, wetlands preservation, cancer awareness and access to cancer screenings, and other causes; he was named the Saints "Walter Payton Man of the Year" in 2009 for his charitable activities. Fujita was inducted into the Ventura County Sports Hall of Fame in 2017.
