= Carmel Unified School District =

School district in California, US

Address
- 4380 Carmel Valley Road Carmel-by-the-Sea, Monterey, California, 93923; United States

District information
- Type: Public
- Grades: K-12
- Established: July 1945; 81 years ago
- Superintendent: Sharon Ofek

Students and staff
- Students: 2,094 (2025-26)

Other information
- Website: www.carmelunified.org

Carmel Unified School District (CUSD) is a school district headquartered in Carmel-by-the-Sea, California.

It includes Carmel-by-the-Sea, the majority of Carmel Valley Village, and sections of Del Monte Forest and Big Sur.

== History ==
The board of education selected Ted Knight as the superintendent in May 2023. Knight resigned after two days as superintendent. The current superintendent is Sharon Ofek.

== Schools ==
=== Secondary ===
- Carmel High School
- Carmel Middle School

=== Elementary ===
- Captain Cooper Elementary School (Big Sur)
- Carmel River Elementary School (south of Carmel-by-the-Sea)
- Tularcitos Elementary School (Carmel Valley)

=== Alternative ===
- Carmel Adult School
- Carmel Valley High School
