= KDON-FM =

Radio station in Salinas, California

Coordinates: 36.756°N 121.502°W

- Salinas, California; United States
- Broadcast area: Central Coast (California)
- Frequency: 102.5 MHz (HD Radio)
- Branding: 102.5 K-Don

Programming
- Language: English
- Format: Rhythmic contemporary
- Affiliations: Compass Media Networks

Ownership
- Owner: iHeartMedia, Inc.; (iHM Licenses, LLC)
- Sister stations: KION, KOCN, KPRC-FM, KTOM-FM

History
- First air date: 1960; 66 years ago
- Former call signs: KSBW-FM (1960–1975); KBEZ (1975–1977); KDON-FM (1977–1990); KDON (1990)
- Call sign meaning: Heritage calls of KION (AM), indicating its affiliation with the Don Lee Network

Technical information
- Licensing authority: FCC
- Facility ID: 26930
- Class: B
- ERP: 15,000 watts
- HAAT: 723 meters (2,372 ft)

Links
- Public license information: Public file; LMS
- Webcast: Listen live (via iHeartRadio)
- Website: kdon.iheart.com

KDON-FM (102.5 MHz "K-Don") is a commercial radio station licensed to Salinas, California, and serving the Monterey–Salinas–Santa Cruz radio market and the Central California Coast. It broadcasts a rhythmic contemporary radio format and is owned by iHeartMedia, Inc. The station's studios are on Moffett Street in Salinas.

KDON-FM has an effective radiated power of 15,000 watts, its transmitter is on San Juan Grade Road, atop Fremont Peak in Prunedale, California.

== History ==
=== KDON ===
KDON went on air for the first time on November 8, 1935, from the Monterey Studios on the grounds of Hotel Del Monte, in Monterey. It was created and established by Allen Griffin, the famous hero of the First World War and founding publisher of the Monterey Herald. In joint-ownership with Griffin at the time was Richard F. Lewis, chief engineer of the station.

Within a short time, the studio was moved into the Herald Building, where Griffin's printing press was located, at the corner of Washington Street and Pearl Street in downtown Monterey. Lewis designed the station's transmitter station, on the Municipal Wharf. The thinking at the time was that the saltwater could provide a good enough grounding for errant voltage from the transmitter.

On December 25, 1936, Richard Lewis was married to Marian Park in Los Angeles. Four days later, on December 29, KDON aired its first Don Lee Mutual network-wide broadcast, officially joining that network. Prior to that, all programming was localized, but after joining Don Lee, it carried broadcasts from and distributed broadcasts to the United States, Canada, Germany, Austria, the British Empire, and Hawaii.

In 1937, Richard Lewis sold his shares to Salinas Newspapers, Inc., owners of the Salinas Index Journal and the Salinas Daily Post (both today The Salinas Californian). At that time, KDON's frequency was 1210, with 100 watts of power. Griffin's executive station manager, commercial manager, and program director was listed as Howard V. Walters. R. F. Lewis, Jr. was the chief engineer. It was still headquartered at the Herald Building, and Griffin's business was registered as the Monterey Peninsula Broadcasting Company.

Sometime in 1937, KDON established remote control studios in Salinas and Santa Cruz. All three studios were fully equipped and relayed to the transmitter at the Municipal Wharf, with the capability for 24 hour programming, but the broadcast day was set at 17 hours. In 1938, Cecil Lynch was listed as program manager.

By 1940, KDON was listed as "Mutual's voice in the Monterey Bay Area." Meanwhile, KHUB from Watsonville, also claimed to be "The voice of the Monterey Bay Area." In 1940, it had moved its headquarters to 275 Pearl Street, with a transmitter on the Municipal Wharf. Their second studio in Santa Cruz was at the Casa del Rey Hotel.

On December 4, 1941, three days before the Attack on Pearl Harbor, KDON increased its power two and a half times to 1240 kilocycles.

In World War II, Griffen recommissioned in the Army – at 47 years old, where he again won more medals in combat. By 1948, he was still listed as a 50% owner of KDON, sharing co-ownership with Salinas Newspapers, Inc. On April 9, 1948, Griffin sold Monterey Peninsula Broadcasting to Salinas Newspapers, Inc.

KDON's previous logo used from September 2010 until May 20, 2014

=== KSBW-FM ===
The modern station signed on in 1960. Its original call sign was KSBW-FM, the counterpart to KSBW 1380 AM (now off the air) and KSBW-TV Channel 8 (now owned by Hearst Television).

KSBW-FM at first simulcast the programming on KSBW 1380 AM, by the late 1960s it was broadcasting an automated beautiful music format. It featured quarter-hour sweeps of soft instrumental cover versions of adult pop music, with limited talk and commercials.

=== Top 40 and Rhythmic Contemporary ===
KSBW-FM became a Top 40/CHR station as KDON-FM in the early 1980s. The KDON call sign has a Top 40 heritage in the Monterey-Salinas market going back to the mid-1960s, when it was used on 1460 AM. The AM station on 1460 kHz gave up those call letters and its Top 40 format to become a talk radio station. KDON-FM began as an automated Top 40 station with no disc jockeys. This was not uncommon for FM Top 40 stations in those days, when most radios only received AM stations. As the years progressed and more listeners switched to the FM band, on-air personalities were added.

The format evolved into Rhythmic Contemporary by 1988 and since then has remained one of the highest rated stations in the Monterey-Salinas-Santa Cruz radio market.

In the early nineties, Mancow Muller hosted a local morning show on KDON (he would later go onto success as a morning host in Chicago and syndicated around the country).
