= KTOM-FM =

Coordinates: 36.552°N 121.789°W

- Marina, California; United States
- Broadcast area: Santa Cruz, California; Monterey, California; Salinas, California
- Frequency: 92.7 MHz
- Branding: 92.7 K-Tom (pronounced "Ninety-Two Seven K-Tom")

Programming
- Format: Country
- Affiliations: Premiere Networks

Ownership
- Owner: iHeartMedia, Inc.; (iHM Licenses, LLC)
- Sister stations: KDON-FM, KION, KOCN, KPRC-FM

History
- First air date: 1982
- Former call signs: KBOQ-FM (1982–1994); KRQC-FM (1994–1999); KMJO (1999–2003)

Technical information
- Licensing authority: FCC
- Facility ID: 40145
- Class: B1
- ERP: 6,900 watts
- HAAT: 189 meters (620 ft)

Links
- Public license information: Public file; LMS
- Webcast: Listen Live
- Website: ktom.iheart.com

KTOM-FM (92.7 MHz, K-TOM) is a commercial radio station in Marina, California, broadcasting to the Santa Cruz–Monterey–Salinas, California, area on 92.7 FM. Its studios are in Salinas, and the transmitter is just east of Monterey. KTOM-FM airs a country format branded as "K-Tom." KTOM used to be on 100.7 and a translator on 100.9. It moved to 92.7 when Clear Channel started to do Spanish formats.

== History ==
Between 1998 and 2002, 92.7 was KMJO, a simulcast of 92.3 FM KSJO in San Jose, California as 92 KSJO, along with 92.7 FM KXJO in San Francisco, California and 92.1 FM KFJO in Walnut Creek, California.
