= KOCN =

Coordinates: 36.552°N 121.789°W

- Pacific Grove, California; United States
- Broadcast area: Monterey/Salinas/Santa Cruz, California
- Frequency: 105.1 MHz (HD Radio)
- Branding: 105.1 K-Ocean

Programming
- Format: Rhythmic adult contemporary
- Subchannels: HD2: KION simulcast

Ownership
- Owner: iHeartMedia, Inc.; (iHM Licenses, LLC)
- Sister stations: KDON-FM, KION, KPRC-FM, KTOM-FM

History
- First air date: 1978
- Former frequencies: 104.9 MHz
- Call sign meaning: Reference to Pacific OCeaN

Technical information
- Licensing authority: FCC
- Facility ID: 8082
- Class: A
- ERP: 1,800 watts
- HAAT: 183 meters
- Translator: HD2: 101.1 K266BD (Carmel Valley)

Links
- Public license information: Public file; LMS
- Webcast: Listen Live
- Website: 1051kocean.iheart.com

KOCN (105.1 FM) is a rhythmic AC radio station licensed to Salinas, California. It has been owned by iHeartMedia, Inc. (formerly Clear Channel Media and Entertainment) since 1997. Its studios are in Salinas, and the transmitter is just east of Monterey.

The station was first licensed April 28, 1978. KOCN was purchased in 1986 by Roger and Cheryl Pasquier for $1 million. It had no ratings and The amount paid for the station was considered stick value. The Pasquiers then change the format to an adult contemporary music station and rose to #4 in the Arbitron rankings for adults #2 in women. In August 1995 K-Ocean 105 moved from 104.9 MHz to 105.1 MHz And changed its format to oldies. The ratings went from number #4 to #1 in the market. In 1997 the station was sold to Clear Channel Communications for approximately $7 million cash including cash and accounts receivables. Its current format is described in its slogan as "The Central Coast's Greatest Throwbacks".

K-Ocean's former logo used until September 2014

K-Ocean's previous logo used until November 2023
