= KPRC-FM =

- Salinas, California; United States
- Broadcast area: Northern Central Coast
- Frequency: 100.7 MHz
- Branding: La Preciosa 100.7 y 100.9

Programming
- Language: Spanish
- Format: Adult hits

Ownership
- Owner: iHeartMedia, Inc.; (iHM Licenses, LLC)
- Sister stations: KDON-FM; KION; KOCN; KTOM-FM

History
- First air date: October 22, 1965
- Former call signs: KRSA-FM (1964–1973); KWYT (1973–1975); KWYT-FM (1975–1984); KTOM-FM (1984–2003)
- Call sign meaning: Station brand, La Preciosa

Technical information
- Licensing authority: FCC
- Facility ID: 8204
- Class: B
- ERP: 1,400 watts
- HAAT: 727 meters (2,385 ft)
- Transmitter coordinates: 36°32′4.9″N 121°37′17.8″W
- Translators: 100.9 K265DG (Hollister); 100.9 K265DK (Greenfield)

Links
- Public license information: Public file; LMS
- Webcast: Listen live (via iHeartRadio)
- Website: salinaslapreciosa.iheart.com

KPRC-FM (100.7 FM) is a radio station broadcasting a Spanish adult hits format in Salinas, California, United States. The station is currently owned by iHeartMedia, Inc. Its studios are in Salinas, and the transmitter is on Mount Toro, 10 miles (16 km) south.

== History ==
KRSA-FM began broadcasting on October 22, 1965, after a construction permit was issued in July 1964. It broadcast a mix of country music and local sports telecasts and was owned alongside KRSA (1570 AM). The AM and FM stations were sold to the Mount Toro Broadcasting Corporation, owned by David Rodgers, in 1972. On October 13, 1973, the station changed its call sign to KWYT.

The Penmont Broadcasting Corporation acquired KWYT-FM in 1977. Community Pacific Broadcasting Corporation acquired it and Salinas AM station KTOM, plus an AM-FM combo in Modesto, in 1982. The new owners switched the FM station from beautiful music back to country on March 1, 1984, and changed the call sign to KTOM-FM to match the AM outlet.

On September 12, 2003, under iHeartMedia predecessor Clear Channel Communications, the company moved KTOM's country music programming to 92.7 MHz to make way for a new Spanish-language classic hits station known as La Preciosa on the 100.7 frequency.
