= KION (AM) =

- Salinas, California; United States
- Broadcast area: Monterey, Salinas, Santa Cruz, Central California Coast
- Frequency: 1460 kHz
- Branding: Powertalk Central Coast 1460 AM and 101.1 FM

Programming
- Format: Talk radio
- Network: Fox News Radio
- Affiliations: Premiere Networks; Westwood One; Golden State Warriors; San Francisco 49ers; San Jose Sharks

Ownership
- Owner: iHeartMedia, Inc.; (iHM Licenses, LLC)
- Sister stations: KDON-FM; KOCN; KPRC-FM; KTOM-FM

History
- First air date: 1949
- Former call signs: KRUZ (CP, 1947–1949); KDON (1949–1986); KLCZ (1986–1987); KDON (1987–1990); KZXR (1990–1991); KHTX (1991–1992); KRQC (1992–1995); KHTX (1995–1997); KDON (1997–1998); KTXX (1998–2002); KION (2002–2004); KABL (2004–2006)
- Call sign meaning: See former sister station KION-TV

Technical information
- Licensing authority: FCC
- Facility ID: 26925
- Class: B
- Power: 10,000 watts
- Transmitter coordinates: 36°43′58.9″N 121°35′35.8″W
- Translators: 101.1 K266BD (Carmel Valley, relays KOCN-HD2)
- Repeater: 105.1 KOCN-HD2 (Pacific Grove)

Links
- Public license information: Public file; LMS
- Webcast: Listen live (via iHeartRadio)
- Website: powertalk1460.iheart.com

KION (1460 kHz) is a commercial AM radio station licensed to Salinas, California, and serving the Monterey-Salinas-Santa Cruz region of the Central California Coast. It broadcasts a talk radio format and owned by iHeartMedia, Inc.

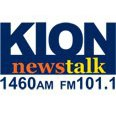
KION's former logo using the AM/FM frequency from 2010 until April 2014

The studios are shared with KION-TV in Salinas.

KION transmits with 10,000 watts. To protect other stations from interference, it uses a directional antenna with a four-tower array. The transmitter is on Natividad Road at Old Stage Road in Natividad, California. Programming is also heard on 99-watt FM translator 101.1 K266BD in Carmel Valley.

== Programming ==
On weekdays, most of KION's schedule is made up of nationally syndicated talk shows: Armstrong and Getty, The Clay Travis and Buck Sexton Show, The Sean Hannity Show, The Glenn Beck Program, The Mark Levin Show and Coast to Coast AM with George Noory. Most hours begin with an update from Fox News Radio.

Weekends feature special interest shows on money, health, home repair, wine and movies. Weekend shows include Sunday Night with Bill Cunningham, At Home with Gary Sullivan and Brian Kilmeade and Friends. Some weekend shows are paid brokered programming.

KION carries sporting events including San Francisco 49ers, San Jose State Spartans, Cal State Monterey Bay Otters, San Jose Sharks, Golden State Warriors and local high school football and basketball.

== History ==
In 1947, the station first signed on the air as KDON. It was co-owned with The Salinas Californian daily newspaper. It used the KDON call sign because it was an affiliate of the Don Lee Network and also carried programs from the Mutual Broadcasting System.

In the 1960s and 1970s, KDON was a Drake-formatted Top 40 station, playing the hits for young listeners. But by the 1980s, most listening to contemporary music was shifting to the FM band. KDON, moved to an adult contemporary format.

The station was assigned the call letters KHTX on December 28, 1991. On January 10, 1992, the station changed its call sign to KRQC. In January 1995, the station reverted to KHTX. On May 1, 1997, the station returned to the call sign KDON, and on October 12, 1998, KTXX. In August 2002, the call letters became the current KION.

However, on October 19, 2004, the station switched to an adult standards sound, using the call letters KABL, originally used on 960 KABL San Francisco (now KNEW). On December 31, 2006, the station dropped the Adult Standards music, reverting to a News/Talk format and changing its call sign back to KION.

In 2011, KION added an FM translator at 101.1 MHz. In 2016, the translator was relicensed to transmit the HD2 digital subchannel of KOCN Pacific Grove at 105.1 MHz. The HD2 signal usually simulcasts KION's AM signal, but it separates programming at various times to originate play-by-play sports when the AM station is airing a brokered program or a different live sports event.
