= Chautauqua Hall =

Historic site in California

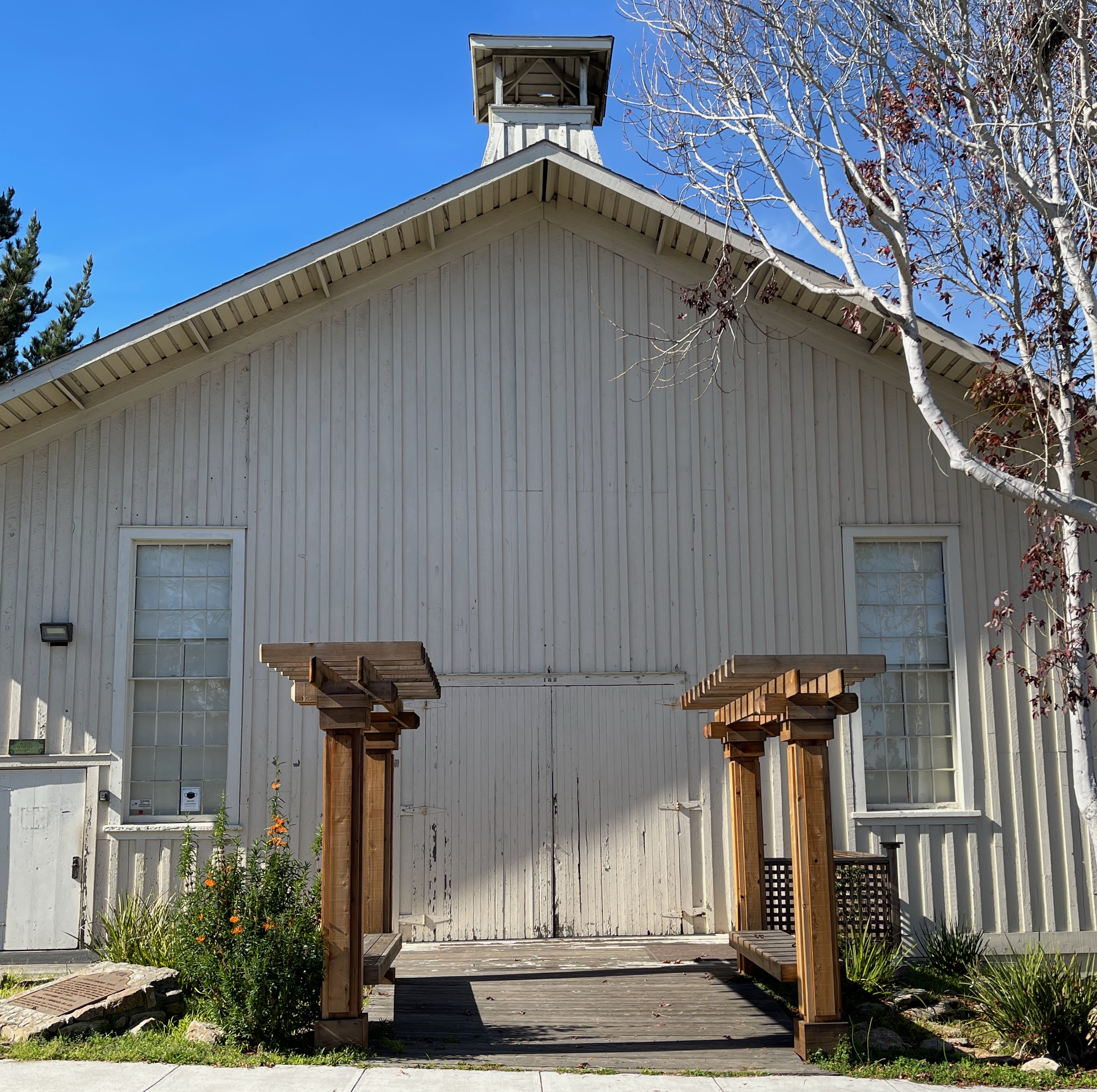
- Chautauqua Hall, Pacific Grove (2022).

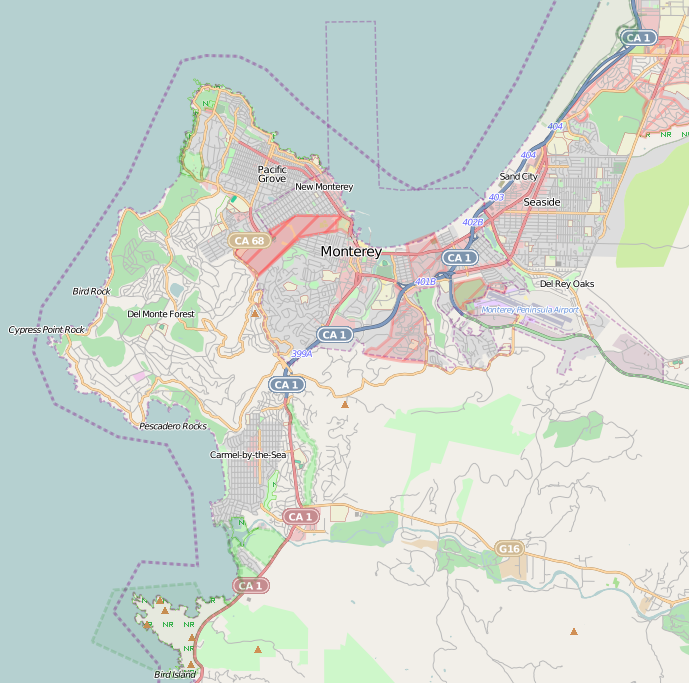
- Location in the Monterey Peninsula
- 36°37′20″N 121°55′06″W
- Location: 16th St., and Central Ave., Pacific Grove, California

History
- Built: 1881

California Historical Landmark
- Reference no.: 839

Chautauqua (/ʃəˈtɔːkwə/ shə-TAW-kwə) Hall is a historic building in Pacific Grove, California, United States. It was built in 1881 by the Pacific Improvement Company for the Pacific Grove Retreat Association for presenting concerts and entertainment. On July 20, 1970, the building was declared a California Historical Landmark #839, and it was listed on the National Register of Historic Places in 2026. In 2022 the hall hosts classes and programs for the city. This facility is Americans with Disabilities Act (ADA) compliant.

== History ==
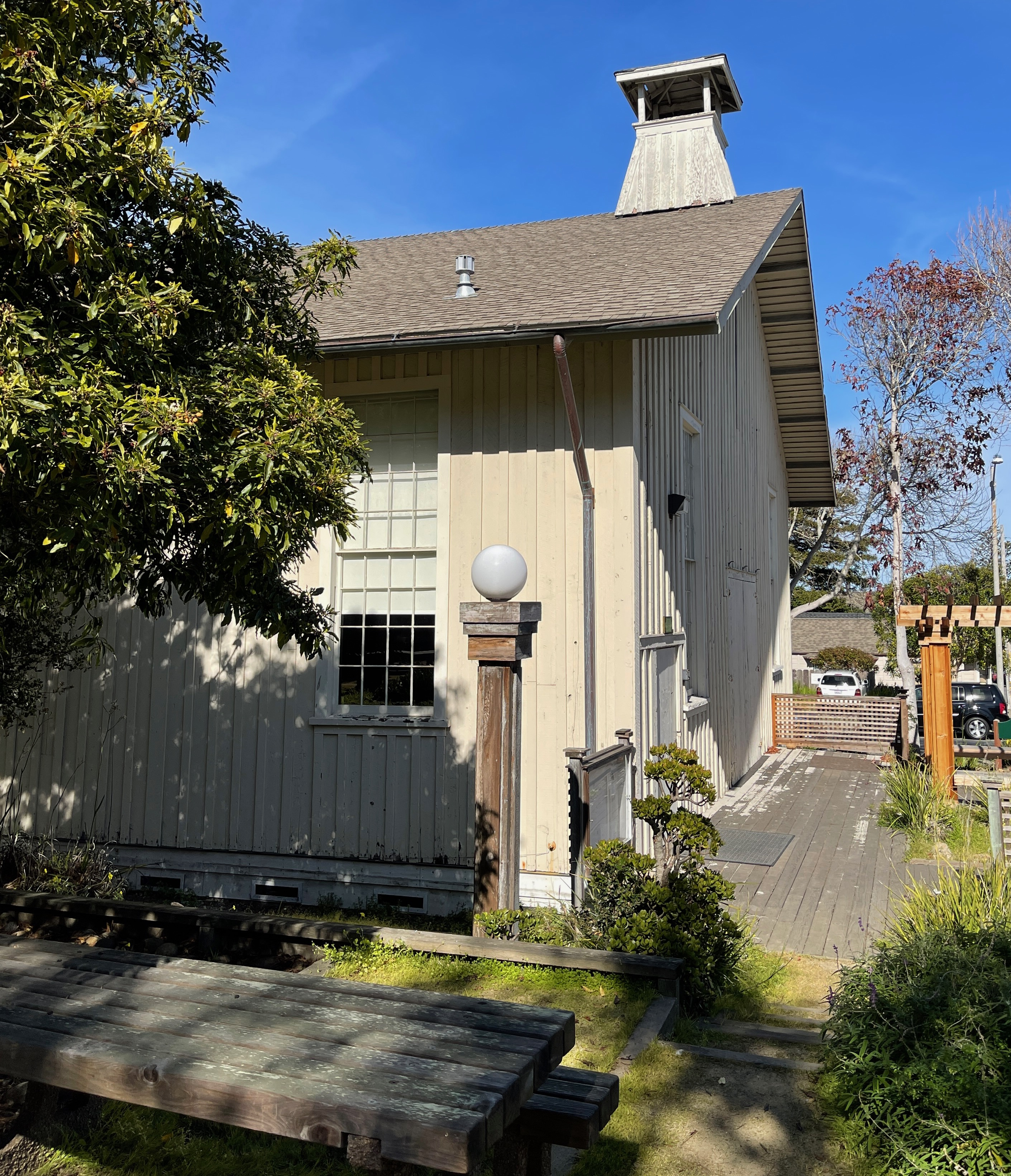
Side view of the Chautauqua Hall (2022).

The Chautauqua Hall was built in 1881 by the Pacific Improvement Company for the Pacific Grove Methodist-Episcopal Camp Retreat for seven years (1881-1888). It is located on the southwest corner of 16th Street and Central Avenue. It was called a "Hall in the Grove," and later became known as Chautauqua Hall. The wood-framed structure has a gable roof and board-and-batten siding. The hall served as a location for hosting the annual Chautauqua Recognition Day ceremonies. During the summer months, the large meeting hall provided a place for public lectures, and two classrooms for Sunday school services. During the winter months, the building served as a storage facility for the campground tents.

The hall dates to the days when Pacific Grove was the western headquarters for the Chautauqua Movement. The Chautauqua Literary and Scientific Circle (CLSC) established a western branch at Pacific Grove in June 1879. Sunday school teachers of the local Methodist Church used the hall as a summer training camp. Known worldwide as 'Chautauqua-by-the-Sea,' it made Pacific Grove a cultural center for adult Christian education.

In 1883, Mary EB Norton instructed a course in general botany during the summer assembly. She had a place to house the Assembly's natural history collection. She held two sessions daily at the Chautauqua Hall.

In 1884, Carrie Lloyd opened a summer school for children in the hall. In 1885, the Pacific Grove School District was formed and classes were held in the hall for several years, until the Methodist Episcopal Church and Assembly Hall was built on Lighthouse Avenue in 1888.

Today, the building is used as a dance hall, with a three-piece band.

== See also ==
- California Historical Landmarks in Monterey County
- Pacific Grove Museum of Natural History
