= Carmel High School (Carmel, California) =

Coordinates: 36°33′19″N 121°54′35″W

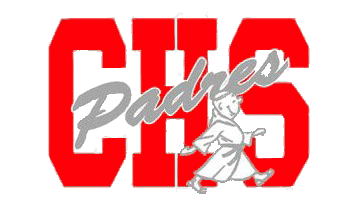

Location
- 3600 Ocean Ave; Carmel, California 93923; United States

Information
- School type: comprehensive high school
- Founded: 1940
- School district: Carmel Unified School District
- Oversight: Western Association of Schools and Colleges, Accrediting Commission for Schools
- Staff: 54.19 (FTE)
- Grades: 9–12
- Enrollment: 780 (2024–2025)
- Student to teacher ratio: 14.39
- Area: Monterey County
- Color
- Team name: Padres
- Rival: Pacific Grove High School
- Newspaper: The Sandpiper
- Website: carmelhigh.carmelunified.org

Carmel High School is a school of 874 students and 50-plus faculty members, situated directly off of Highway 1 within the city of Carmel, California. It is a part of Carmel Unified School District.

Carmel Unified School District is the second largest geographical district in the state of California enrolling students up to 40 miles (64 km) south of Carmel and 20 miles (32 km) east. Communities represented by CUSD, which has Carmel High as its only comprehensive high school, include Carmel-by-the-Sea, the majority of Carmel Valley Village, and sections of Del Monte Forest. The district also includes Big Sur, and Pebble Beach. Built in 1940, the school made significant capital improvements in the 2010s including a new performing arts theater, math wing, science wing, and library with plans to renovate the current administration building. Both the theater and science wing utilized "green" construction practices, such as energy efficient lights and appliances.

== History ==
On August 4, 1939, the 22 miles (35 km) Hatton Ranch was purchased for $31,000, by the Carmel Board of Trustees, for the proposed Carmel high school. By November, plans for the new high school were drawn up by Ernest J. Kump Jr. The school opened on September 6, 1940.

In 1947, four local residents donated their own parcels of land for what would later become the ballfield to the added Carmel High School property. The legal deed indicates Mary Flanders Hudson, husband William, and Helen and Charles Fuller transferred the property for a $10.00, ten dollar, sale price.

== Academics ==
Carmel High School operates on a two-semester, modified-block system with 50-minute class periods three days per week and 90-minute periods two days per week. Students at Carmel High have access to a rigorous curriculum including these 19 Advanced Placement courses.

Carmel High School uses an "open-access" policy, allowing students to enroll in advanced curriculum with no obstacle apart from earning a C or higher in articulating subjects the prior year. As a result, Carmel High has strong participation in the AP Program with 423 students (50% of total students) completing a total of 928 AP exams in 2017 with an overall pass rate of 75%.

As of 2018, the average ACT score for CHS students was a 27.1 and U.S. News & World Report ranked Carmel High as #330 in the country.

As of 2026, Carmel High School is #245 in the country, according to Niche.

Carmel High School has a multiple valedictorian policy. In order to be a valedictorian, students are required to have taken a minimum of 13 Honors or Advanced Placement courses (earning nothing below an A−). The graduation ceremony includes 2 student speeches. Valedictorians have the option to audition for the role of "speaking valedictorian" while auditions for the other speaking role are open to the rest of the graduating class. Graduation usually takes place on the campus of Carmel High School. On June 3, 2020, due to the COVID-19 pandemic, a drive-though graduation ceremony took place at the WeatherTech Raceway Laguna Seca in Monterey, California; it was broadcast by the Monterey County Office of Education via YouTube.

== Rankings ==
Newsweek ranked Carmel High School #191 in their America's Best High School public school rankings (2013). U.S. News & World Report ranked Carmel High #199 in their national ranking of best high schools (2017) and #21 in the state of California. The Washington Post ranked Carmel High School #288 in the nation (2017).

== Athletics ==
Carmel High shares a cross town rivalry with Pacific Grove High School, wherein every year the two varsity football teams compete in "The Shoe Game", so named after a shoe that was bronzed and made into a trophy by Carmel High students in an attempt to start the rivalry.

The school's mascot is the Padre, which pays homage to the peninsula's history with the Spanish missionaries, specifically Saint Junipero Serra, with the Carmel Mission located just over a mile from the campus. In 2020, Alumni began to call for Carmel High to replace the Padre mascot. Saint Junipero Serra is important to California's history, yet his 18th-century accomplishments are controversial for many local Carmel Residents. No outcome or resolution has occurred.

== Notable alumni ==
- Sylvia M. Broadbent (Class of 1948), anthropologist, professor of Amerindian studies, Muisca scholar
- Chris Cope (Class of 2001), professional mixed martial artist, formerly competing for the UFC in the Welterweight Division
- Scott (Reeves) Eastwood (Class of 2003), actor
- Rushad Eggleston (Class of 1997), Grammy-nominated musician
- Sam Farr (Class of 1959), former U.S. Congressman (California, 17th District)
- Jimmy Panetta (Class of 1987), U.S. Congressman (California, 19h District)
- Chris Prieto (Class of 1990), former MLB baseball player and former 1st Base Coach, Tampa Bay Rays
- Brandon Roberts (Class of 1994), Emmy-winning music composer
- Sherod Santos (Class of 1966), American Poet, essayist, translator and playwright
- Philip Schwyzer (Class of 1988), Professor of Renaissance Literature at the University of Exeter.
- Norman Spaulding (Class of 1989), Professor of Law at Stanford Law School
- Kerry Woodson (Class of 1987), former MLB pitcher (Seattle Mariners)
