= Cedar Street Times =

- Type: Weekly newspaper
- Editor: Marge Ann Jameson
- Founded: 2008
- Headquarters: 306 Grand Ave. Pacific Grove, California
- Website: cedarstreettimes.com

Cedar Street Times was a weekly newspaper in Pacific Grove, California. Originally established as an online publication, it has had a print version since September 2008. It is published to subscribers Thursday evenings, and Fridays at pickup locations.

In 2013, the Times purchased the competing Pacific Grove paper, the Hometown Bulletin. In 2014, owner Marge Ann Wimpee (also known as Marge Ann Jameson) filed for Chapter 13 bankruptcy. As of 2017, it was the only newspaper in Pacific Grove; in that year, it won an award as the "Best Woman-Owned Business" in the Monterey area.
