= Hollister Free Lance =

Weekly newspaper published in Hollister, California

- Type: Weekly newspaper
- Format: Broadsheet
- Owner: Weeklys
- Founder: John McGonigle
- Publisher: Dan Pulcrano
- Founded: 1873
- Language: English
- Sister newspapers: Gilroy Dispatch; Morgan Hill Times
- Website: sanbenito.com

The Hollister Free Lance is a weekly newspaper published in Hollister, California and distributed in San Benito County, California. It is owned by Weeklys.

== History ==
On March 12, 1872, William Shaw established the Hollister Advance. On October 18, 1873, John McGonigle published the first edition of the Hollister Enterprise. Six years later the paper was acquired by Sylvan H. Brummett.

On February 12, 1880, S.H. Brummett, editor of the Enterprise, was approached in front of a courthouse by George W. Carlton, co-owner of a rival paper called the Hollister Telegraph. They had been bitterly feuding over a government contact and Brummett recently called Carlton a "horse thief." In response, Carlton fatally shot Brummett in the head. A jury convicted Carlton of manslaughter, but he appealed to the California Supreme Court who ordered a retrial. After two hung juries, the case was dismissed.

On February 5, 1881, Major John S. Hay bought the Enterprise and the Telegraph. He merged them into a single paper called The Pacific Coast. A short time later W.J and A.J. Jones bought the combined paper and renamed it to The Democrat. Maurice T. Dooling and James A. Kearney purchased it a year or two later. In 1884, Lester P. Baldwin and Robert Shaw bought the paper and renamed it to the Free Lance.

W.B. Winn, a former preached, bought the Free Lance in 1886. He sold the paper in 1891 to J. L. Lahiff, who then merged it with his paper, the Hesperian. Lahiff was city editor, and his business partner Robert P. Stephenson served as editor. James G. Piratsky succeeded Lahiff as co-owner in 1893 but left after becoming county clerk in 1902. Stephenson was then joined by Alexander P. Bettersworth, followed by Madison D. Hall. On January 22, 1910, the two launched a daily edition of the Free Lance. That September, Hall was replaced by Bettersworth and James Kearney. In 1912, Bettersworth sold his quarter interest to Millard F. Hoyle Sr. He became the sole owner by 1916.

The Hollister newspaper market was a competitive one. In 1921, the publisher of the Free Lance, which claimed a circulation of 1,019, placed an ad in Editor & Publisher, a trade magazine, offering a $250 reward to anyone who could produce proof that the Morning Daily Advance of Hollister published more than 1,026 copies. In 1923, Walter Keene bought the Hollister Advance after it had been published by the Shaw family for 50 years. He sold it to Hoyle in 1937. The Advance continued as a weekly edition for rural areas and out of state residents. Hoyle's wife transferred ownership in 1957 to their son Millard F. Hoyle Jr.

In 1981, El Dorado Newspapers, a subsidiary of McClatchy Newspapers, became co-owner of the Free Lance. In 1986, the Advance ceased. In 1997, McClatchy sold the Hollister Free Lance, along with the Gilroy Dispatch, Morgan Hill Times and Amador Ledger-Dispatch to Central Valley Publishing, which was managed by USMedia Group, Inc., of Crystal City, Missouri. The company's name was changed a few years later to Pacific Sierra Publishing Company. In 2004, Mainstreet Media purchased ten publications from Pacific Sierra, including the Free Lance.

In April 2014, the Hollister Free Lance was purchased by New SV Media Inc., a subsidiary of Metro Newspapers of San Jose, California. In October 2014, Metro's CEO Dan Pulcrano began to move the paper away from its alignment with petroleum drilling interests and attacks on environmentalists, publicly separating itself from a $1.9 million oil company-funded political campaign in opposition to San Benito County Measure J that heavily featured the Free Lance’s logo and quotes from an opinion piece by its former editorial board.
