= The Morgan Hill Times =

Weekly newspaper published in Morgan Hill, California

- Type: Weekly newspaper
- Owner: Weeklys
- Founder: George Edes
- President: Dan Pulcrano
- Founded: 1894
- Language: English
- City: Morgan Hill, California
- Sister newspapers: Gilroy Dispatch; Hollister Free Lance
- Website: morganhilltimes.com

The Morgan Hill Times is a weekly newspaper in Morgan Hill, California. It is owned by Weeklys. The newspaper is Morgan Hill’s oldest continually operating business.

== History ==
On April 2, 1894, George A. Edes published the first edition of the Morgan Hill Sun. On June 7, 1899, W.G. Bohannon and I.B. Briscoe launched a rival paper called Morgan Hill Times. In December 1900, Rev. H.H. Farnham bought the Morgan Hill Times. He bought the Sun from Edes in February 1901 and merged it with his paper to form the Sun-Times. The "Sun" was dropped from the name and the paper has continued as The Morgan Hill Times.

In 1979, Welton L. Pollard sold the Times to Gavilan Newspapers, a subsidiary of McClatchy Newspapers. In 1997, McClatchy sold the Morgan Hill Times, along with the Hollister Free Lance, Gilroy Dispatch and Amador Ledger-Dispatch to Central Valley Publishing, which was managed by USMedia Group, Inc., of Crystal City, Missouri. The company's name was changed a few years later to Pacific Sierra Publishing Company. In 2004, Mainstreet Media purchased ten publications from Pacific Sierra, including the Times. In April 2014, the paper was purchased by New SV Media Inc., a subsidiary of Metro Newspapers of San Jose, California.
