= Gilroy Dispatch =

Weekly newspaper published in Gilroy, California

- Type: Weekly newspaper
- Format: Broadsheet
- Owner: Weeklys
- Founder(s): G.M Hanson; C.F. Macy
- Publisher: Dan Pulcrano
- Editor: Erik Chalhoub
- Founded: September 12, 1868 (as the Gilroy Advocate)
- Language: English
- Headquarters: 7455 Monterey Rd; Gilroy, California 95020; United States
- Sister newspapers: Hollister Free Lance; Morgan Hill Times
- Website: gilroydispatch.com

The Gilroy Dispatch is a weekly newspaper published in Gilroy, California. It is owned by Weeklys.

== History ==
On September 12, 1868, G.M Hanson and C.F. Macy published the first edition of the Gilroy Advocate. Frederick W. Blake purchased the paper in 1877 and published it until his death in 1907. At that time, the Advocate was passed down to his son William F. Blake.

On September 12, 1925, John N. Hall and Thomas Losey published the first edition of the Gilroy Dispatch. Losey sold his stake to Al Nedom in 1926. Lloyd E. Smith sold the Anderson News and bought out Nedom in 1928, and then John N. Hall two years later. Smith bought the Gilroy Advocate in 1933 from William F. Blake. Six years later Smith sold his papers in 1939 to Anderson Browne and James W. Marmaduke. A few months later Smith bought the Los Gatos Times.

In 1941, William G. Werner bought the Gilroy Dispatch, at that time a five-day daily paper, the weekly Gilroy Advocate and shopper Gilroy Advertiser. At some point the Advocate was absorbed into the Dispatch. In 1949, William G. Werner sold the Dispatch to Joseph C. Houghteling, Patrick H. Peabody and George R. Kane. In 1972, Jerry Fuchs and Millard Hoyle bought the paper from the trio. Fuchs was the paper's business manager and Hoyle was owner of the Hollister Free Lance. In 1978, Fuchs and Hoyle sold the Dispatch to El Dorado Newspapers Publishing Co., a subsidiary owned by McClatchy Newspapers. At that time the paper had a circulation of 6,500.

In 1997, McClatchy sold the Gilroy Dispatch, along with the Hollister Free Lance, Morgan Hill Times and Amador Ledger-Dispatchto Central Valley Publishing, which was managed by USMedia Group, Inc., of Crystal City, Missouri. The company's name was changed a few years later to Pacific Sierra Publishing Company. In 2004, Mainstreet Media purchased ten publications from Pacific Sierra, including the Disptch. In April 2014, the Dispatch was purchased by New SV Media Inc., a subsidiary of Metro Newspapers of San Jose, California. After decades in a building at the south end of Monterey Street, the Dispatch returned to downtown Gilroy in August 2016, moving its offices to 64 W 6th St.
