= 2024 United States presidential election in California =

- November 5, 2024
- Turnout: 71.43% (of registered voters) ▼9.24 pp 59.97% (of eligible voters) ▼10.91 pp

Nominee	Kamala Harris	Donald Trump
Party	Democratic	Republican
Home state	California	Florida
Running mate	Tim Walz	JD Vance
Electoral vote	54	0
Popular vote	9,276,179	6,081,697
Percentage	58.47%	38.33%

Harris
40–50%
50–60%
60–70%
70–80%
80–90%
Trump
40–50%
50–60%
60–70%
70–80%
President before election
Joe Biden
Democratic
Elected President
Donald Trump
Republican

The 2024 United States presidential election in California took place on Tuesday, November 5, 2024, as part of the 2024 United States presidential election in which all 50 states plus the District of Columbia participated. California voters chose electors to represent them in the Electoral College via a popular vote. California has 54 electoral votes in the Electoral College, the most in the country.

The most populous state in the union, California is considered a strongly blue state, having voted Democratic in every presidential election since 1992. In these contests, it has supported Democratic candidates by double digits in each of them except for 2004, when John Kerry won it by 9.95 percentage points. California is the home state of incumbent Vice President Kamala Harris, it was widely expected that California voters would maintain this trend, particularly with Harris as the Democratic nominee. Harris, a native of California, served as the state's attorney general from 2011 to 2017 and later represented California in the U.S. Senate from 2017 to 2021 before assuming the vice presidency. She is the first Californian to lead a major party presidential ticket since Ronald Reagan in 1984 and the first Democrat from the Western United States.

Although Kamala Harris won in California by a margin of 20 percentage points, it represented a significant decrease compared to Joe Biden's 29-point victory in the state in 2020. This trend of diminished Democratic voter turnout was also evident in other traditionally Democratic strongholds, including Massachusetts, New York and Illinois. Harris's performance in California was the worst for a Democratic candidate since 2004, failing to receive at least 60% of the vote in the state for the first time since then.

Republicans have not won a presidential election in California since 1988.

== Primary elections ==
=== Democratic primary ===
The California Democratic primary was held on Super Tuesday, March 5, 2024. President Biden won all 424 pledged delegates with nearly 90% of the vote, the largest share of delegates awarded by any contest in the 2024 primaries.

Popular vote share by county Biden: 80–90%; >90%

2024 California Democratic pres. primary
Candidate	Votes	%	Delegates
Joe Biden (incumbent)	3,207,687	89.15	424
Marianne Williamson	146,356	4.07	0
Dean Phillips	100,284	2.79	0
Armando Perez-Serrato	43,105	1.20	0
Gabriel Cornejo	41,390	1.15	0
"President" R. Boddie	25,455	0.71	0
Stephen P. Lyons	21,062	0.59	0
Eban Cambridge	12,758	0.35	0
Write-in votes	29	<0.01	—
Total	3,598,126	100%	424

The electors of the Democratic Party are chosen by the candidates who received the most votes in the primary election in their respective congressional district.

=== Republican primary ===
The California Republican primary was held on Super Tuesday, March 5, 2024. Former president Donald Trump was challenged by Nikki Haley, the only other major candidate remaining in the Republican primaries. Trump won the state in a landslide, defeating Haley by 60 points and earning all 169 delegates.

The state was the site of the second Republican primary debate, held at the Ronald Reagan Presidential Library on September 27, 2023.

Popular vote share by county Trump: 60–70%; 70–80%; 80–90%

California Republican primary, March 5, 2024
Candidate	Votes	Percentage	Actual delegate count		
Candidate	Votes	Percentage	Bound	Unbound	Total
Donald Trump	1,962,905	79.25%	169	0	169
Nikki Haley	431,876	17.44%	0	0	0
Ron DeSantis (withdrawn)	35,717	1.44%	0	0	0
Chris Christie (withdrawn)	20,210	0.82%	0	0	0
Vivek Ramaswamy (withdrawn)	11,113	0.45%	0	0	0
Rachel Swift	4,253	0.17%	0	0	0
David Stuckenberg	3,909	0.16%	0	0	0
Ryan Binkley (withdrawn)	3,577	0.14%	0	0	0
Asa Hutchinson (withdrawn)	3,336	0.13%	0	0	0
Total:	2,476,896	100.00%	169	0	169

The electors of the Republican Party are their nominees for the main offices of the State of California and for senator at the last two elections, as well as their leaders in the state legislature and party committee.

=== Libertarian primary ===
Charles Ballay was the only candidate to qualify for the Libertarian Party primary ballot. Chase Oliver later qualified as a write-in candidate.

2024 California Libertarian presidential primary
- March 5, 2024
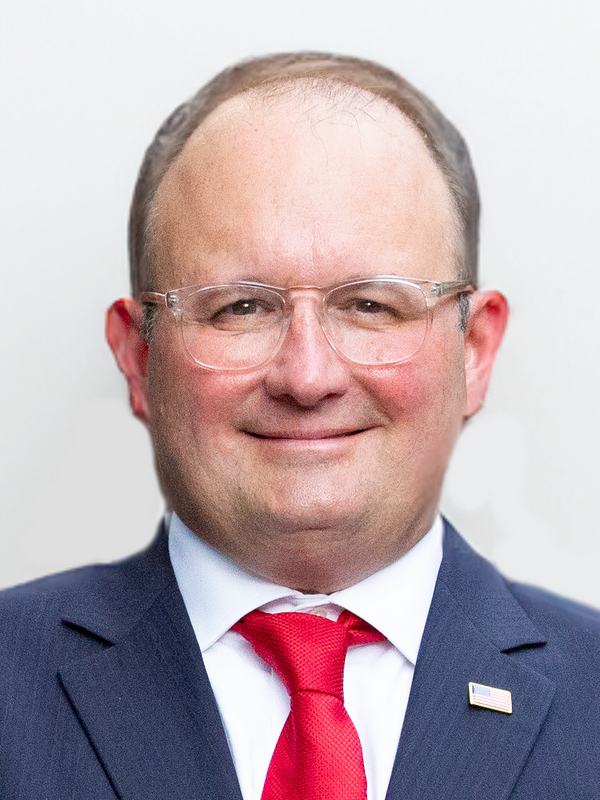

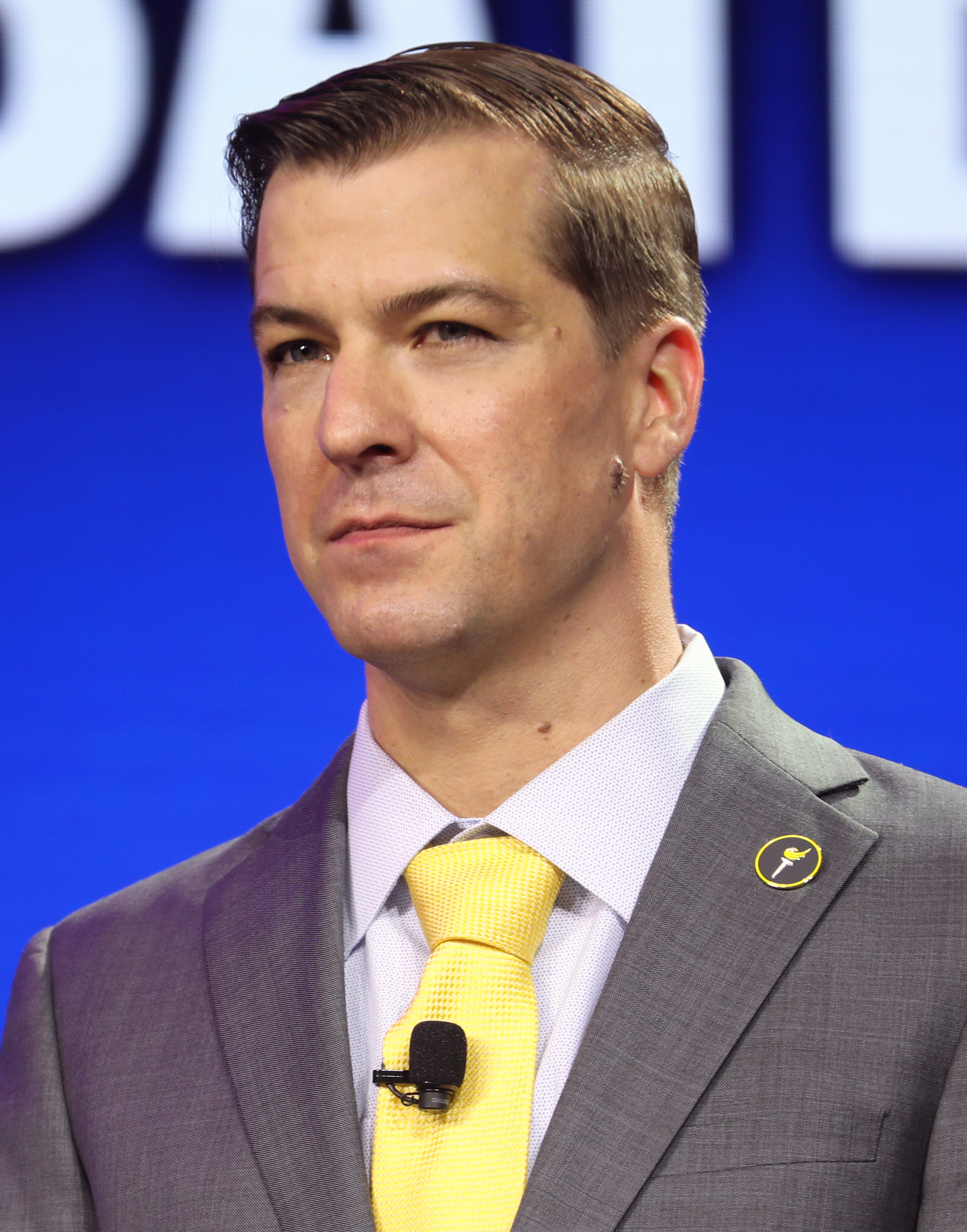
Candidate	Charles Ballay	Chase Oliver (Write in)
Home state	Louisiana	Georgia
Percentage	98.6%	1.4%

2024 California Libertarian primary
Candidate	Votes	Percentage			
Candidate	Votes	Percentage	Charles Ballay	21,906	98.6%
Chase Oliver (write-in)	313	1.4%			
Total:	22,219	100.0%			

The electors for the Libertarian Party were elected by the state party convention.

=== Green primary ===
Jill Stein, the Green Party's nominee for president in 2012 and 2016, was the only candidate on the California primary ballot, although she was followed by three write-in candidates. Stein won the primary and earned all 59 of the state's delegates.

2024 California Green primary
Candidate	Votes	Percentage	Delegates
Jill Stein	15,801	99.96%	59
Matthew Pruden (write-in)	3	0.02%	
Jorge Zavala (write-in)	3	0.02%	
Davi (write-in)	1	0.00%	
Total:	15,808	100.0%	59

=== Peace and Freedom primary ===
Peace and Freedom primary results by county: Claudia De la Cruz: 100% 80–85% 75–80% 70–75% 65–70% 60–65% 55–60% 50–55% 45–50% 40–45% 35–40%; Cornel West: 100% 65–70% 60–65% 55–60% 50–55% 45–50% 40–45% 35–40%; De la Cruz-West tie: 45–50% 40–45% 35–40%; De la Cruz-Sherman tie: 50%; West-Sherman tie: 35–40%; No votes: No votes

Three candidates successfully achieved ballot access in the Peace and Freedom Party non-binding presidential primary: Claudia de la Cruz, the nominee for the Party for Socialism and Liberation; Cornel West, who ran an independent campaign after withdrawing from the Green nomination; and Jasmine Sherman. The party's presidential nominee was chosen by the state central committee in August.

2024 California Peace and Freedom primary
Candidate	Votes	Percentage			
Candidate	Votes	Percentage	Claudia de la Cruz	6,430	47.0%
Cornel West	5,455	39.9%			
Jasmine Sherman	1,795	13.1%			
Total:	13,680	100.0%			

=== American Independent Party ===
The sole candidate of the American Independent Party primary was James Bradley, who was simultaneously running for the U.S. Senate as a Republican in the blanket primary held on the same day. Andrew George Rummel also qualified as an official write-in candidate.

2024 California American Independent primary
Candidate	Votes	Percentage			
Candidate	Votes	Percentage	James Bradley	45,565	99.96%
Andrew George Rummel (write-in)	16	0.04%			
Total:	45,581	100.0%			

== General election ==
=== Candidates ===
In California, six political parties have qualified for ballot access in the 2024 election. On August 29, 2024, California secretary of state Shirley Weber published the certified list of candidates for the general election:

- Kamala Harris / Tim Walz — Democratic
- Donald Trump / JD Vance — Republican
- Robert F. Kennedy Jr. / Nicole Shanahan — American Independent (Note: Kennedy suspended his campaign on August 23, after the deadline for ballot access had passed, and thus remained on the ballot.)
- Jill Stein / Butch Ware — Green
- Chase Oliver / Mike ter Maat — Libertarian
- Claudia De la Cruz / Karina Garcia — Peace and Freedom (Note: De la Cruz and Garcia are affiliated with the Party for Socialism and Liberation on a national level.)

Weber's office published the list of write-in candidates on October 25, in which Peter Sonski was the only certified candidate listed, alongside his running mate Lauren Onak.

=== Predictions ===
Source	Ranking	As of
The Cook Political Report	Solid D	December 19, 2023
Inside Elections	Solid D	April 26, 2023
Sabato's Crystal Ball	Safe D	June 29, 2023
Decision Desk HQ/The Hill	Safe D	December 14, 2023
CNalysis	Solid D	December 30, 2023
CNN	Solid D	January 14, 2024
The Economist	Safe D	June 12, 2024
538	Solid D	June 11, 2024
NBC News	Safe D	October 6, 2024

=== Polling ===
Kamala Harris vs. Donald Trump

Poll source	Date(s) administered	Sample size (Note: Key: A – all adults RV – registered voters LV – likely voters V – unclear)	Margin of error	Kamala Harris Democratic	Donald Trump Republican	Other / Undecided
Research Co.	November 2–3, 2024	450 (LV)	± 4.6%	64%	32%	4%
Competitive Edge Research	October 28–30, 2024	517 (RV)	± 4.3%	53%	38%	8% (Note: "Someone else" with 4%)
UC Berkeley IGS	October 22–28, 2024	4,341 (LV)	± 2.0%	57%	35%	8%
ActiVote	October 7–27, 2024	400 (LV)	± 4.9%	63%	37%	–
Rose Institute/YouGov	October 7–17, 2024	1,139 (RV)	± 3.4%	60%	33%	7% (Note: "Other" with 7%)
Rose Institute/YouGov	October 7–17, 2024	1,139 (RV)	± 3.4%	63% (Note: With voters who lean towards a given candidate)	34%	3%
Rose Institute/YouGov	October 7–17, 2024	1,139 (LV)	± 3.4%	63%	34%	3%
Emerson College (Note: Poll sponsored by Inside CA Politics and The Hill)	October 12–14, 2024	1,000 (LV)	± 3.0%	59%	35%	6% (Note: "Someone else" with 2%)
Emerson College	October 12–14, 2024	1,000 (LV)	± 3.0%	61%	37%	2%
ActiVote	September 22 – October 10, 2024	400 (LV)	± 4.9%	63.5%	36.5%	–
ActiVote	August 22 – September 21, 2024	400 (LV)	± 4.9%	64%	36%	–
Emerson College	September 3–5, 2024	815 (LV)	± 3.4%	60%	36%	4%
Emerson College	September 3–5, 2024	815 (LV)	± 3.4%	61%	38%	1% (Note: "Someone else" with 1%)
ActiVote	August 2–19, 2024	400 (LV)	± 4.9%	65%	35%	–
UC Berkeley IGS	July 31 – August 11, 2024	3,765 (LV)	± 2.0%	59%	34%	7%
	July 21, 2024	Kamala Harris declares her candidacy.				
Emerson College/Inside California Elections (Note: Poll sponsored by Nexstar Media Group)	November 11–14, 2023	1,000 (RV)	± 3.0%	47%	38%	15%

Kamala Harris vs. Donald Trump vs. Robert F. Kennedy Jr. vs. Cornel West vs. Jill Stein vs. Chase Oliver

Poll source	Date(s) administered	Sample size	Margin of error	Kamala Harris Democratic	Donald Trump Republican	Robert F. Kennedy Jr. Independent	Cornel West Independent	Jill Stein Green	Chase Oliver Libertarian	Other / Undecided
Cygnal (R)	October 27–30, 2024	611 (LV)	± 4.0%	55%	31%	4%	–	2%	1%	7% (Note: Claudia De la Cruz (PSL) with 2%)
Public Policy Institute of California	October 7–15, 2024	1,137 (LV)	± 3.7%	59%	33%	3%	–	1%	0%	4% (Note: Claudia De la Cruz (PSL) with 1%)
UC Berkeley IGS	September 25 – October 1, 2024	3,045 (LV)	± 2.5%	57%	35%	2%	1%	1%	0%	4%
University of Southern California/CSU Long Beach/Cal Poly Pomona	September 12–25, 2024	1,685 (LV)	± 2.4%	58%	36%	2%	–	2%	0%	2% (Note: Claudia De la Cruz (PSL) with 0%)
Capitol Weekly	September 11–16, 2024	1,054 (LV)	–	59%	34%	3%	0%	2%	–	2%
Capitol Weekly	August 23–26, 2024	3,154 (LV)	–	58%	36%	4%	0%	2%	–	–
	August 23, 2024	Robert F. Kennedy, Jr. suspends his presidential campaign and endorses Donald Trump.								
Capitol Weekly	August 13–15, 2024	1,738 (LV)	–	57%	37%	5%	0%	1%	–	–
Capitol Weekly	July 25–27, 2024	1,904 (LV)	–	59%	35%	5%	0%	2%	–	–
	July 21, 2024	Kamala Harris declares her candidacy.								
Capitol Weekly	July 19–22, 2024	2,121 (LV)	–	54%	33%	7%	0%	4%	–	2%
Capitol Weekly	July 12–14, 2024	1,044 (LV)	–	54%	35%	7%	0%	3%	–	2%

Hypothetical polling with Joe Biden and Donald Trump

Joe Biden vs. Donald Trump

Poll source	Date(s) administered	Sample size	Margin of error	Joe Biden Democratic	Donald Trump Republican	Other / Undecided
	July 21, 2024	Joe Biden withdraws from the race.				
Public Policy Institute of California	June 24 – July 2, 2024	1,261 (LV)	± 3.7%	55%	30%	15% (Note: "Someone else" with 11%)
Public Policy Institute of California	May 23 – June 2, 2024	1,098 (LV)	± 3.9%	55%	31%	14% (Note: "Someone else" with 13%)
The Bullfinch Group (Note: Poll sponsored by The Independent Center)	April 16–23, 2024	250 (RV)	± 6.2%	59%	34%	7%
John Zogby Strategies (Note: Poll conducted for Kennedy's campaign)	April 13–21, 2024	740 (LV)	–	56%	38%	6%
Public Policy Institute of California	March 19–25, 2024	1,089 (LV)	± 3.9%	54%	31%	14%
Mainstreet Research/Florida Atlantic University	February 29 – March 3, 2024	740 (RV)	–	54%	36%	10% (Note: "Another candidate" with 6%)
Mainstreet Research/Florida Atlantic University	February 29 – March 3, 2024	692 (LV)	–	56%	37%	7% (Note: "Another candidate" with 4%)
Emerson College/Inside California Elections	February 24–27, 2024	1,000 (RV)	± 3.0%	57%	35%	8%
UC Berkeley IGS	February 22–26, 2024	6,536 (LV)	± 1.5%	52%	34%	14%
Emerson College/Inside California Elections	February 16–18, 2024	1,000 (RV)	± 3.0%	55%	33%	12%
Public Policy Institute of California	February 6–13, 2024	1,075 (LV)	± 3.9%	55%	32%	13%
Emerson College/Inside California Elections	January 11–14, 2024	1,087 (RV)	± 2.9%	54%	34%	12%
UC Berkeley IGS	January 1–4, 2024	4,471 (LV)	± 2.0%	56%	37%	19%
Emerson College/Inside California Elections	November 11–14, 2023	1,000 (RV)	± 3.0%	50%	37%	13%
Public Policy Institute of California	November 9–16, 2023	1,113 (LV)	± 3.2%	54%	30%	16%
UC Berkeley IGS	October 24–30, 2023	4,506 (LV)	± 2.5%	46%	31%	23%
Public Policy Institute of California	October 3–19, 2023	1,377 (LV)	± 4.0%	60%	29%	12%
Data Viewpoint	October 1, 2023	533 (RV)	± 4.3%	67%	33%	–
Public Policy Institute of California	August 25 – September 5, 2023	1,146 (LV)	± 3.7%	57%	26%	17% (Note: "Someone else" with 12%; "Would not vote" with 2%)
UC Berkeley IGS	August 24–29, 2023	6,030 (RV)	± 2.0%	51%	31%	18%
Public Policy Institute of California	June 7–29, 2023	1,089 (LV)	± 3.8%	57%	31%	12%
Emerson College/Inside California Elections	June 4–7, 2023	1,056 (RV)	± 2.9%	54%	32%	14%
Public Policy Institute of California	May 17–24, 2023	1,062 (LV)	± 3.9%	58%	25%	17%
UC Berkeley/Los Angeles Times	February 14–20, 2023	7,512 (RV)	± 2.0%	57%	27%	16%
UC Berkeley/Los Angeles Times	February 14–20, 2023	5,149 (LV)	± 2.0%	59%	29%	12%

Joe Biden vs. Donald Trump vs. Robert F. Kennedy Jr. vs. Cornel West vs. Jill Stein

Poll source	Date(s) administered	Sample size	Margin of error	Joe Biden Democratic	Donald Trump Republican	Robert F. Kennedy Jr. Independent	Cornel West Independent	Jill Stein Green	Other / Undecided
Capitol Weekly	September 11–16, 2024	1,054 (LV)	–	51%	34%	4%	0%	3%	8%
Capitol Weekly	August 23–26, 2024	3,154 (LV)	–	52%	35%	4%	0%	3%	5%
Capitol Weekly	August 13–15, 2024	1,738 (LV)	–	51%	36%	6%	2%	1%	5%
	July 21, 2024	Joe Biden withdraws from the race.							
Capitol Weekly	July 19–22, 2024	2,121 (LV)	–	52%	35%	6%	0%	4%	3% (Note: Claudia De la Cruz (PSL) with 3%)
Capitol Weekly	July 12–14, 2024	1,044 (LV)	–	51%	33%	6%	0%	5%	5% (Note: Claudia De la Cruz (PSL) with 4%)
The Bullfinch Group	April 16–23, 2024	250 (RV)	± 6.2%	48%	28%	12%	2%	2%	8%
Emerson College/Inside California Elections	February 24–27, 2024	1,000 (RV)	± 3.0%	51%	32%	6%	2%	1%	8%
UC Berkeley IGS	February 22–26, 2024	6,536 (LV)	± 1.5%	40%	28%	11%	3%	2%	16%
Emerson College/Inside California Elections	February 16–18, 2024	1,000 (RV)	± 3.0%	49%	31%	8%	1%	1%	10%
USC Dornsife/CSU Long Beach/Cal Poly Pomona	January 21–29, 2024	1,416 (LV)	± 2.6%	53%	25%	7%	3%	1%	9% (Note: Lars Mapstead (L) with 0%)
Emerson College/Inside California Elections	January 11–14, 2024	1,087 (RV)	± 2.9%	47%	32%	6%	1%	1%	13%
UC Berkeley IGS	January 1–4, 2024	4,471 (LV)	± 2.0%	47%	31%	7%	2%	2%	11%
Emerson College/Inside California Elections	November 11–14, 2023	1,000 (RV)	± 3.0%	43%	31%	8%	1%	2%	15%
UC Berkeley IGS	October 24–30, 2023	4,506 (LV)	± 2.5%	43%	29%	9%	4%	–	15%

Hypothetical polling with other candidates

Joe Biden vs. Robert F. Kennedy Jr.

Poll source	Date(s) administered	Sample size	Margin of error	Joe Biden Democratic	Robert F. Kennedy Jr. Independent	Other / Undecided
John Zogby Strategies	April 13–21, 2024	740 (LV)	–	51%	40%	9%

Robert F. Kennedy Jr. vs. Donald Trump

Poll source	Date(s) administered	Sample size	Margin of error	Robert F. Kennedy Jr. Independent	Donald Trump Republican	Other / Undecided
John Zogby Strategies	April 13–21, 2024	740 (LV)	–	47%	35%	18%

Joe Biden vs. Ron DeSantis

Poll source	Date(s) administered	Sample size	Margin of error	Joe Biden Democratic	Ron DeSantis Republican	Other / Undecided
Emerson College/Inside California Elections	June 4–7, 2023	1,056 (RV)	± 2.9%	54%	28%	18%
UC Berkeley/Los Angeles Times	February 14–20, 2023	7,512 (RV)	± 2.0%	54%	31%	15%
UC Berkeley/Los Angeles Times	February 14–20, 2023	5,149 (LV)	± 2.0%	56%	34%	10%

Joe Biden vs. Nikki Haley

Poll source	Date(s) administered	Sample size	Margin of error	Joe Biden Democratic	Nikki Haley Republican	Other / Undecided
Data Viewpoint	October 1, 2023	533 (RV)	± 4.3%	58%	42%	–

Gavin Newsom vs. Donald Trump

Poll source	Date(s) administered	Sample size	Margin of error	Gavin Newsom Democratic	Donald Trump Republican	Other / Undecided
Emerson College/Inside California Elections	November 11–14, 2023	1,000 (RV)	± 3.0%	53%	35%	13%

Gavin Newsom vs. Ron DeSantis

Poll source	Date(s) administered	Sample size	Margin of error	Gavin Newsom Democratic	Ron DeSantis Republican	Other / Undecided
Probolsky Research	August 4–9, 2022	900 (LV)	± 3.3%	55%	38%	7%

=== Results ===
State assembly district results: Trump 40–50% 50–60% 60–70% / Harris 40–50% 50–60% 60–70% 70–80% 80–90%

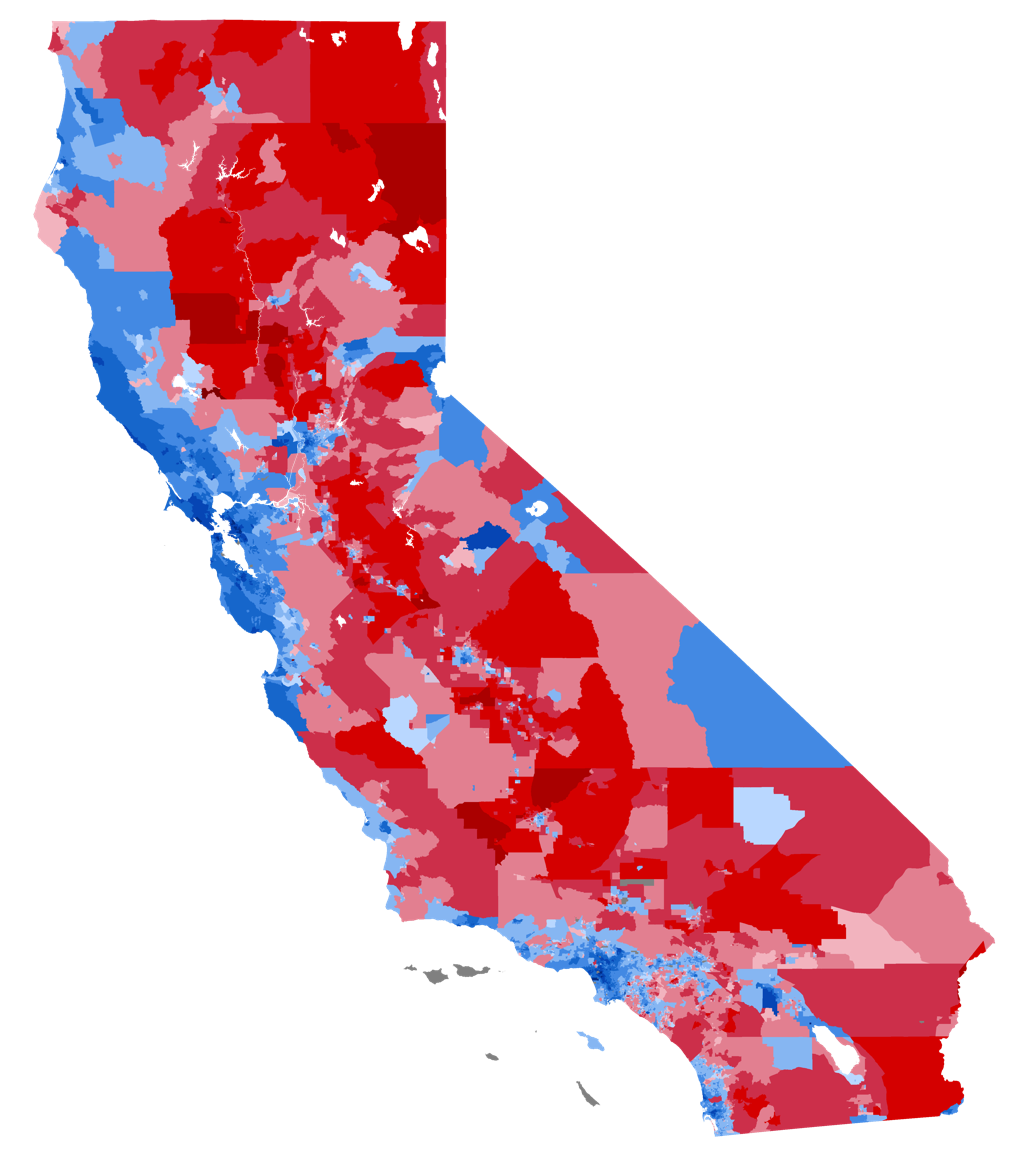
Census block group results Harris: >90%; 80–90%; 70–80%; 60–70%; 50–60%; 40–50%; Trump: >90%; 80–90%; 70–80%; 60–70%; 50–60%; 40–50%

2024 United States presidential election in California
Party	Candidate	Votes	%	±%
Democratic	Kamala Harris; Tim Walz	9,276,179	58.47%	▼5.01%
Republican	Donald Trump; JD Vance	6,081,697	38.33%	▲4.01%
American Independent	Robert F. Kennedy Jr. (withdrawn); Nicole Shanahan (withdrawn)	197,645	1.25%	▲0.91%
Green	Jill Stein; Butch Ware	167,814	1.06%	▲0.60%
Peace and Freedom	Claudia De la Cruz; Karina Garcia	72,539	0.46%	▲0.17%
Libertarian	Chase Oliver; Mike ter Maat	66,662	0.42%	▼0.65%
American Solidarity	Peter Sonski (write-in); Lauren Onak (write-in)	2,939	0.02%	▲0.01%
Total votes		15,865,475	100.00%	N/A

==== By county ====
County	Kamala Harris Democratic		Donald Trump Republican		Various candidates Other parties		Margin		Total votes cast
County	#	%	#	%	#	%	#	%	Total votes cast
Alameda	499,551	74.57%	140,789	21.02%	29,567	4.41%	358,762	53.55%	669,907
Alpine	479	64.91%	243	32.93%	16	2.17%	236	31.98%	738
Amador	7,783	34.74%	14,018	62.57%	602	2.69%	-6,235	-27.83%	22,403
Butte	44,228	46.77%	47,179	49.90%	3,149	3.33%	-2,951	-3.12%	94,556
Calaveras	9,181	34.67%	16,625	62.78%	674	2.55%	-7,444	-28.11%	26,480
Colusa	2,431	34.62%	4,414	62.87%	176	2.51%	-1,983	-28.24%	7,021
Contra Costa	356,008	67.30%	155,308	29.36%	17,671	3.34%	200,700	37.94%	528,987
Del Norte	4,266	40.38%	5,999	56.78%	300	2.84%	-1,733	-16.40%	10,565
El Dorado	47,703	42.63%	61,109	54.61%	3,096	2.77%	-13,406	-11.98%	111,908
Fresno	151,628	46.50%	165,924	50.89%	8,497	2.61%	-14,296	-4.38%	326,049
Glenn	3,260	31.22%	6,904	66.12%	278	2.66%	-3,644	-34.90%	10,442
Humboldt	39,800	61.96%	21,559	33.56%	2,873	4.47%	18,241	28.40%	64,232
Imperial	26,083	48.27%	26,546	49.12%	1,409	2.61%	-463	-0.86%	54,038
Inyo	4,201	46.92%	4,468	49.91%	284	3.17%	-267	-2.98%	8,953
Kern	108,241	38.21%	167,879	59.26%	7,164	2.53%	-59,638	-21.05%	283,284
Kings	15,519	37.39%	25,074	60.41%	915	2.20%	-9,555	-23.02%	41,508
Lake	12,794	47.81%	13,161	49.18%	806	3.01%	-367	-1.37%	26,761
Lassen	2,478	21.79%	8,619	75.80%	274	2.41%	-6,141	-54.01%	11,371
Los Angeles	2,417,109	64.82%	1,189,862	31.91%	122,118	3.27%	1,227,247	32.91%	3,729,089
Madera	20,981	38.40%	32,344	59.20%	1,307	2.39%	-11,363	-20.80%	54,632
Marin	116,152	80.59%	24,054	16.69%	3,923	2.72%	92,098	63.90%	144,129
Mariposa	3,622	38.09%	5,625	59.15%	262	2.76%	-2,003	-21.06%	9,509
Mendocino	24,049	61.32%	13,528	34.49%	1,642	4.19%	10,521	26.83%	39,219
Merced	40,190	46.51%	43,955	50.87%	2,266	2.62%	-3,765	-4.36%	86,411
Modoc	1,008	25.10%	2,884	71.81%	124	3.09%	-1,876	-46.71%	4,016
Mono	3,522	58.08%	2,294	37.83%	248	4.09%	1,228	20.25%	6,064
Monterey	93,060	63.41%	49,226	33.54%	4,468	3.04%	43,834	29.87%	146,754
Napa	43,212	65.91%	20,357	31.05%	1,992	3.04%	22,855	34.86%	65,561
Nevada	33,784	54.36%	26,177	42.12%	2,183	3.51%	7,607	12.24%	62,144
Orange	691,731	49.72%	654,815	47.06%	44,761	3.22%	36,916	2.65%	1,391,307
Placer	103,958	44.26%	123,941	52.77%	6,972	2.97%	-19,983	-8.51%	234,871
Plumas	4,020	39.92%	5,725	56.85%	325	3.23%	-1,705	-16.93%	10,070
Riverside	451,782	48.04%	463,677	49.30%	25,051	2.66%	-11,895	-1.26%	940,510
Sacramento	381,564	58.10%	252,140	38.39%	23,043	3.51%	129,424	19.71%	656,747
San Benito	15,179	54.89%	11,702	42.32%	771	2.79%	3,477	12.57%	27,652
San Bernardino	362,114	47.53%	378,416	49.67%	21,316	2.80%	-16,302	-2.14%	761,846
San Diego	841,372	56.93%	593,270	40.14%	43,386	2.94%	248,102	16.79%	1,478,028
San Francisco	323,719	80.33%	62,594	15.53%	16,684	4.14%	261,125	64.80%	402,997
San Joaquin	126,647	48.03%	128,996	48.92%	8,066	3.06%	-2,349	-0.89%	263,709
San Luis Obispo	81,314	53.92%	64,932	43.05%	4,566	3.03%	16,382	10.86%	150,812
San Mateo	242,957	73.50%	76,616	23.18%	10,992	3.33%	166,341	50.32%	330,565
Santa Barbara	114,149	61.78%	64,870	35.11%	5,762	3.12%	49,279	26.67%	184,781
Santa Clara	510,744	68.04%	210,924	28.10%	28,938	3.86%	299,820	39.94%	750,606
Santa Cruz	100,998	75.28%	27,978	20.85%	5,179	3.86%	73,020	54.43%	134,155
Shasta	27,130	30.51%	59,539	66.96%	2,250	2.53%	-32,409	-36.45%	88,919
Sierra	641	36.52%	1,066	60.74%	48	2.74%	-425	-24.22%	1,755
Siskiyou	8,329	38.74%	12,461	57.96%	708	3.29%	-4,132	-19.22%	21,498
Solano	113,997	60.04%	70,345	37.05%	5,541	2.92%	43,652	22.99%	189,883
Sonoma	179,600	71.42%	63,426	25.22%	8,439	3.36%	116,174	46.20%	251,465
Stanislaus	85,347	43.21%	106,986	54.16%	5,192	2.63%	-21,639	-10.96%	197,525
Sutter	13,016	33.09%	25,372	64.50%	951	2.42%	-12,356	-31.41%	39,339
Tehama	7,415	27.94%	18,503	69.73%	618	2.33%	-11,088	-41.78%	26,536
Trinity	2,449	43.38%	2,979	52.76%	218	3.86%	-530	-9.39%	5,646
Tulare	53,221	38.48%	81,854	59.18%	3,234	2.34%	-28,633	-20.70%	138,309
Tuolumne	10,909	37.86%	17,210	59.72%	697	2.42%	-6,301	-21.87%	28,816
Ventura	217,424	56.08%	158,901	40.99%	11,379	2.93%	58,523	15.09%	387,704
Yolo	61,405	66.30%	27,844	30.06%	3,372	3.64%	33,561	36.23%	92,621
Yuba	10,725	35.66%	18,491	61.49%	856	2.85%	-7,766	-25.82%	30,072
Totals	9,276,179	58.47%	6,081,697	38.33%	507,599	3.20%	3,194,482	20.13%	15,865,475

===== Counties that flipped from Democratic to Republican =====
- Butte (largest municipality: Chico)
- Fresno (largest municipality: Fresno)
- Imperial (largest municipality: El Centro)
- Inyo (largest municipality: Bishop)
- Lake (largest municipality: Clearlake)
- Merced (largest municipality: Merced)
- Riverside (largest municipality: Riverside)
- San Bernardino (largest municipality: San Bernardino)
- San Joaquin (largest municipality: Stockton)
- Stanislaus (largest municipality: Modesto)

==== By congressional district ====
Harris won 41 of 52 congressional districts. Trump won 11 congressional districts, including two that elected Democrats.

District	Harris	Trump	Representative
1st	36.1%	61.1%	Doug LaMalfa
2nd	70.9%	25.7%	Jared Huffman
3rd	46.5%	50.3%	Kevin Kiley
4th	64.0%	32.8%	Mike Thompson
5th	39.9%	57.6%	Tom McClintock
6th	55.2%	41.4%	Ami Bera
7th	63.1%	33.3%	Doris Matsui
8th	70.1%	26.6%	John Garamendi
9th	47.6%	49.4%	Josh Harder
10th	65.2%	31.4%	Mark DeSaulnier
11th	81.8%	14.1%	Nancy Pelosi
12th	84.5%	10.6%	Barbara Lee (118th Congress)
12th	84.5%	10.6%	Lateefah Simon (119th Congress)
13th	46.0%	51.4%	John Duarte (118th Congress)
13th	46.0%	51.4%	Adam Gray (119th Congress)
14th	65.8%	30.3%	Eric Swalwell
15th	72.2%	24.3%	Kevin Mullin
16th	72.5%	23.9%	Anna Eshoo (118th Congress)
16th	72.5%	23.9%	Sam Liccardo (119th Congress)
17th	66.7%	28.8%	Ro Khanna
18th	63.2%	33.7%	Zoe Lofgren
19th	65.4%	31.0%	Jimmy Panetta
20th	33.7%	64.0%	Vince Fong
21st	50.6%	46.8%	Jim Costa
22nd	45.8%	51.6%	David Valadao
23rd	40.2%	57.1%	Jay Obernolte
24th	60.9%	35.9%	Salud Carbajal
25th	50.1%	47.6%	Raul Ruiz
26th	55.2%	42.0%	Julia Brownley
27th	50.5%	46.6%	Mike Garcia (118th Congress)
27th	50.5%	46.6%	George Whitesides (119th Congress)
28th	61.8%	34.9%	Judy Chu
29th	65.8%	31.0%	Tony Cárdenas (118th Congress)
29th	65.8%	31.0%	Luz Rivas (119th Congress)
30th	68.8%	27.8%	Adam Schiff (118th Congress)
30th	68.8%	27.8%	Laura Friedman (119th Congress)
31st	56.9%	40.0%	Grace Napolitano (118th Congress)
31st	56.9%	40.0%	Gil Cisneros (119th Congress)
32nd	64.2%	32.9%	Brad Sherman
33rd	52.9%	44.2%	Pete Aguilar
34th	73.1%	22.4%	Jimmy Gomez
35th	53.7%	43.4%	Norma Torres
36th	67.9%	28.8%	Ted Lieu
37th	78.7%	18.3%	Sydney Kamlager-Dove
38th	56.5%	40.4%	Linda Sánchez
39th	53.3%	43.6%	Mark Takano
40th	47.2%	49.5%	Young Kim
41st	45.7%	51.7%	Ken Calvert
42nd	64.5%	32.0%	Robert Garcia
43rd	72.9%	23.9%	Maxine Waters
44th	65.3%	31.5%	Nanette Barragán
45th	49.3%	47.7%	Michelle Steel (118th Congress)
45th	49.3%	47.7%	Derek Tran (119th Congress)
46th	57.3%	39.6%	Lou Correa
47th	50.3%	46.2%	Katie Porter (118th Congress)
47th	50.3%	46.2%	Dave Min (119th Congress)
48th	41.1%	56.4%	Darrell Issa
49th	52.5%	44.7%	Mike Levin
50th	63.1%	33.5%	Scott Peters
51st	60.2%	36.7%	Sara Jacobs
52nd	59.3%	38.1%	Juan Vargas

==== By city ====
By municipality

Official outcome by city and unincorporated areas of counties, of which Harris won 359 and Trump won 181
City	County	Kamala Harris Democratic		Donald Trump Republican		Various candidates Other parties		Margin		Total votes	2020 to 2024 swing %
City	County	#	%	#	%	#	%	#	%	Total votes	2020 to 2024 swing %
Alameda	Alameda	31,843	80.02%	6,506	16.35%	1,445	3.63%	25,337	63.67%	39,794	-4.27%
Albany	Alameda	8,439	87.04%	842	8.68%	414	4.27%	7,597	78.36%	9,695	-4.59%
Berkeley	Alameda	52,902	89.79%	3,032	5.15%	2,984	5.06%	49,870	84.64%	58,918	-5.13%
Dublin	Alameda	17,772	65.55%	8,069	29.76%	1,271	4.69%	9,703	35.79%	27,112	-11.76%
Emeryville	Alameda	4,596	85.30%	497	9.22%	295	5.48%	4,099	76.08%	5,388	-7.22%
Fremont	Alameda	53,649	64.61%	25,376	30.56%	4,015	4.84%	28,273	34.05%	83,040	-13.75%
Hayward	Alameda	34,856	69.34%	13,652	27.16%	1,760	3.50%	21,204	42.18%	50,268	-14.14%
Livermore	Alameda	26,804	60.79%	15,897	36.05%	1,390	3.15%	10,907	24.74%	44,091	-2.41%
Newark	Alameda	11,285	65.46%	5,234	30.36%	721	4.18%	6,051	35.10%	17,240	-13.54%
Oakland	Alameda	146,320	85.44%	15,804	9.23%	9,132	5.33%	130,516	76.21%	171,256	-7.88%
Piedmont	Alameda	6,294	85.96%	818	11.17%	210	2.87%	5,476	74.79%	7,322	-2.30%
Pleasanton	Alameda	24,120	65.36%	11,317	30.67%	1,468	3.98%	12,803	34.69%	36,905	-4.47%
San Leandro	Alameda	23,530	71.08%	8,464	25.57%	1,110	3.35%	15,066	45.51%	33,104	-10.49%
Union City	Alameda	17,713	66.41%	7,863	29.48%	1,096	4.11%	9,850	36.93%	26,672	-15.47%
Unincorporated area	Alameda	39,428	66.83%	17,418	29.52%	2,149	3.64%	22,010	37.31%	58,995	-9.18%
Unincorporated area	Alpine	479	64.91%	243	32.93%	16	2.17%	236	31.98%	738	0.67%
Amador	Amador	89	64.49%	45	32.61%	4	2.90%	44	31.88%	138	4.91%
Ione	Amador	898	28.58%	2,173	69.16%	71	2.26%	-1,275	-40.58%	3,142	-2.57%
Jackson	Amador	1,073	41.21%	1,456	55.91%	75	2.88%	-383	-14.71%	2,604	-0.91%
Plymouth	Amador	229	34.70%	408	61.82%	23	3.48%	-179	-27.12%	660	-5.78%
Sutter Creek	Amador	707	44.30%	843	52.82%	46	2.88%	-136	-8.52%	1,596	0.26%
Unincorporated area	Amador	4,787	33.56%	9,093	63.76%	382	2.68%	-4,306	-30.19%	14,262	-4.20%
Biggs	Butte	215	29.86%	488	67.78%	17	2.36%	-273	-37.92%	720	-12.63%
Chico	Butte	26,904	59.83%	16,320	36.30%	1,740	3.87%	10,584	23.54%	44,964	-3.74%
Gridley	Butte	991	40.80%	1,366	56.24%	72	2.96%	-375	-15.44%	2,429	-10.84%
Oroville	Butte	2,292	36.84%	3,744	60.17%	186	2.99%	-1,452	-23.34%	6,222	-7.33%
Paradise	Butte	2,057	35.45%	3,569	61.51%	176	3.03%	-1,512	-26.06%	5,802	-4.02%
Unincorporated area	Butte	11,769	34.23%	21,692	63.08%	925	2.69%	-9,923	-28.86%	34,386	-5.01%
Angels	Calaveras	785	37.90%	1,230	59.39%	56	2.70%	-445	-21.49%	2,071	-3.39%
Unincorporated area	Calaveras	8,396	34.40%	15,395	63.07%	617	2.53%	-6,999	-28.68%	24,408	-4.35%
Colusa	Colusa	784	34.97%	1,391	62.04%	67	2.99%	-607	-27.07%	2,242	-8.57%
Williams	Colusa	578	49.57%	552	47.34%	36	3.09%	26	2.23%	1,166	-24.52%
Unincorporated area	Colusa	1,069	29.59%	2,471	68.39%	73	2.02%	-1,402	-38.80%	3,613	-9.07%
Antioch	Contra Costa	27,879	64.36%	14,007	32.34%	1,429	3.30%	13,872	32.03%	43,315	-13.46%
Brentwood	Contra Costa	17,772	54.68%	13,728	42.24%	1,000	3.08%	4,044	12.44%	32,500	-5.24%
Clayton	Contra Costa	4,079	57.54%	2,787	39.31%	223	3.15%	1,292	18.23%	7,089	-4.29%
Concord	Contra Costa	35,367	66.05%	16,511	30.84%	1,665	3.11%	18,856	35.22%	53,543	-6.21%
Danville	Contra Costa	16,421	61.70%	9,306	34.97%	888	3.34%	7,115	26.73%	26,615	-2.04%
El Cerrito	Contra Costa	12,249	85.78%	1,466	10.27%	565	3.96%	10,783	75.51%	14,280	-3.99%
Hercules	Contra Costa	9,090	73.40%	2,938	23.72%	357	2.88%	6,152	49.67%	12,385	-8.72%
Lafayette	Contra Costa	11,997	75.96%	3,292	20.84%	504	3.19%	8,705	55.12%	15,793	-0.41%
Martinez	Contra Costa	13,898	66.65%	6,257	30.01%	698	3.35%	7,641	36.64%	20,853	-4.82%
Moraga	Contra Costa	7,049	74.93%	2,033	21.61%	326	3.47%	5,016	53.32%	9,408	0.06%
Oakley	Contra Costa	10,126	52.18%	8,769	45.18%	512	2.64%	1,357	6.99%	19,407	-11.05%
Orinda	Contra Costa	9,625	77.40%	2,442	19.64%	368	2.96%	7,183	57.76%	12,435	-1.68%
Pinole	Contra Costa	6,319	70.58%	2,331	26.04%	303	3.38%	3,988	44.54%	8,953	-9.12%
Pittsburg	Contra Costa	17,578	67.99%	7,527	29.11%	750	2.90%	10,051	38.87%	25,855	-15.99%
Pleasant Hill	Contra Costa	13,305	70.92%	4,817	25.68%	639	3.41%	8,488	45.24%	18,761	-3.09%
Richmond	Contra Costa	30,764	79.91%	6,295	16.35%	1,440	3.74%	24,469	63.56%	38,499	-12.34%
San Pablo	Contra Costa	5,612	73.75%	1,720	22.60%	277	3.64%	3,892	51.15%	7,609	-18.46%
San Ramon	Contra Costa	24,985	64.60%	11,950	30.90%	1,741	4.50%	13,035	33.70%	38,676	-9.05%
Walnut Creek	Contra Costa	29,681	73.57%	9,455	23.44%	1,209	3.00%	20,226	50.13%	40,345	0.35%
Unincorporated area	Contra Costa	52,212	63.22%	27,677	33.51%	2,694	3.26%	24,535	29.71%	82,583	-6.95%
Crescent City	Del Norte	604	47.75%	620	49.01%	41	3.24%	-16	-1.26%	1,265	-3.46%
Unincorporated area	Del Norte	3,662	39.38%	5,379	57.84%	258	2.77%	-1,717	-18.46%	9,299	-0.39%
Placerville	El Dorado	2,556	49.53%	2,458	47.64%	146	2.83%	98	1.90%	5,160	-3.29%
South Lake Tahoe	El Dorado	5,549	61.75%	3,122	34.74%	315	3.51%	2,427	27.01%	8,986	-8.80%
Unincorporated area	El Dorado	39,598	40.51%	55,529	56.81%	2,617	2.68%	-15,931	-16.30%	97,744	-2.54%
Clovis	Fresno	21,451	38.63%	32,789	59.04%	1,296	2.33%	-11,338	-20.42%	55,536	-5.74%
Coalinga	Fresno	1,486	39.78%	2,145	57.41%	105	2.81%	-659	-17.64%	3,736	-12.32%
Firebaugh	Fresno	950	54.66%	735	42.29%	53	3.05%	215	12.37%	1,738	-28.34%
Fowler	Fresno	1,310	43.78%	1,618	54.08%	64	2.14%	-308	-10.29%	2,992	-24.90%
Fresno	Fresno	85,521	52.72%	72,197	44.50%	4,511	2.78%	13,324	8.21%	162,229	-12.99%
Huron	Fresno	450	65.89%	208	30.45%	25	3.66%	242	35.43%	683	-30.03%
Kerman	Fresno	2,073	45.84%	2,336	51.66%	113	2.50%	-263	-5.82%	4,522	-26.39%
Kingsburg	Fresno	1,720	30.08%	3,872	67.70%	127	2.22%	-2,152	-37.63%	5,719	-5.09%
Mendota	Fresno	858	55.11%	652	41.88%	47	3.02%	206	13.23%	1,557	-34.88%
Orange Cove	Fresno	966	56.36%	702	40.96%	46	2.68%	264	15.40%	1,714	-36.14%
Parlier	Fresno	1,579	62.63%	898	35.62%	44	1.75%	681	27.01%	2,521	-26.17%
Reedley	Fresno	3,118	45.62%	3,523	51.55%	193	2.82%	-405	-5.93%	6,834	-17.24%
San Joaquin	Fresno	415	71.80%	151	26.12%	12	2.08%	264	45.67%	578	-21.31%
Sanger	Fresno	4,017	52.10%	3,499	45.38%	194	2.52%	518	6.72%	7,710	-19.26%
Selma	Fresno	3,204	49.27%	3,168	48.72%	131	2.01%	36	0.55%	6,503	-18.78%
Unincorporated area	Fresno	22,510	36.65%	37,431	60.94%	1,481	2.41%	-14,921	-24.29%	61,422	-8.28%
Orland	Glenn	1,076	40.41%	1,504	56.48%	83	3.12%	-428	-16.07%	2,663	-11.42%
Willows	Glenn	717	33.80%	1,343	63.32%	61	2.88%	-626	-29.51%	2,121	-3.99%
Unincorporated area	Glenn	1,467	25.93%	4,057	71.70%	134	2.37%	-2,590	-45.78%	5,658	-7.34%
Arcata	Humboldt	6,961	80.33%	1,122	12.95%	582	6.72%	5,839	67.39%	8,665	-5.46%
Blue Lake	Humboldt	489	71.70%	160	23.46%	33	4.84%	329	48.24%	682	-1.76%
Eureka	Humboldt	7,918	67.36%	3,307	28.14%	529	4.50%	4,611	39.23%	11,754	-2.15%
Ferndale	Humboldt	475	52.49%	403	44.53%	27	2.98%	72	7.96%	905	0.78%
Fortuna	Humboldt	2,402	44.61%	2,798	51.96%	185	3.44%	-396	-7.35%	5,385	-1.35%
Rio Dell	Humboldt	487	36.42%	807	60.36%	43	3.22%	-320	-23.93%	1,337	-8.46%
Trinidad	Humboldt	169	73.80%	49	21.40%	11	4.80%	120	52.40%	229	-11.13%
Unincorporated area	Humboldt	20,899	59.25%	12,913	36.61%	1,459	4.14%	7,986	22.64%	35,271	-5.58%
Brawley	Imperial	3,729	46.36%	4,099	50.96%	216	2.69%	-370	-4.60%	8,044	-23.13%
Calexico	Imperial	6,938	57.32%	4,839	39.98%	326	2.69%	2,099	17.34%	12,103	-28.01%
Calipatria	Imperial	424	47.22%	446	49.67%	28	3.12%	-22	-2.45%	898	-27.03%
El Centro	Imperial	7,005	50.15%	6,589	47.17%	374	2.68%	416	2.98%	13,968	-24.84%
Holtville	Imperial	850	46.40%	935	51.04%	47	2.57%	-85	-4.64%	1,832	-27.37%
Imperial	Imperial	3,216	40.44%	4,568	57.44%	169	2.12%	-1,352	-17.00%	7,953	-26.22%
Westmorland	Imperial	276	55.76%	202	40.81%	17	3.43%	74	14.95%	495	-18.91%
Unincorporated area	Imperial	3,645	41.74%	4,868	55.75%	219	2.51%	-1,223	-14.01%	8,732	-21.50%
Bishop	Inyo	918	55.91%	675	41.11%	49	2.98%	243	14.80%	1,642	-2.02%
Unincorporated area	Inyo	3,283	44.92%	3,793	51.89%	233	3.19%	-510	-6.98%	7,309	-3.33%
Arvin	Kern	1,803	58.48%	1,199	38.89%	81	2.63%	604	19.59%	3,083	-31.55%
Bakersfield	Kern	56,523	41.04%	77,768	56.47%	3,431	2.49%	-21,245	-15.43%	137,722	-12.27%
California City	Kern	1,804	44.74%	2,082	51.64%	146	3.62%	-278	-6.89%	4,032	-2.85%
Delano	Kern	4,945	52.88%	4,133	44.19%	274	2.93%	812	8.68%	9,352	-28.93%
Maricopa	Kern	48	14.37%	275	82.34%	11	3.29%	-227	-67.96%	334	-5.66%
McFarland	Kern	1,211	52.77%	1,008	43.92%	76	3.31%	203	8.85%	2,295	-36.62%
Ridgecrest	Kern	4,211	35.94%	7,105	60.63%	402	3.43%	-2,894	-24.70%	11,718	-0.28%
Shafter	Kern	2,239	36.96%	3,673	60.63%	146	2.41%	-1,434	-23.67%	6,058	-24.78%
Taft	Kern	398	17.60%	1,831	80.95%	33	1.46%	-1,433	-63.35%	2,262	-2.34%
Tehachapi	Kern	1,292	32.59%	2,559	64.54%	114	2.88%	-1,267	-31.95%	3,965	-2.76%
Wasco	Kern	2,060	45.70%	2,304	51.11%	144	3.19%	-244	-5.41%	4,508	-20.95%
Unincorporated area	Kern	31,707	32.38%	63,942	65.30%	2,268	2.32%	-32,235	-32.92%	97,917	-7.16%
Avenal	Kings	641	47.73%	655	48.77%	47	3.50%	-14	-1.04%	1,343	-34.35%
Corcoran	Kings	1,332	47.67%	1,395	49.93%	67	2.40%	-63	-2.25%	2,794	-14.77%
Hanford	Kings	7,992	38.38%	12,378	59.44%	454	2.18%	-4,386	-21.06%	20,824	-8.78%
Lemoore	Kings	3,224	37.35%	5,208	60.34%	199	2.31%	-1,984	-22.99%	8,631	-9.09%
Unincorporated area	Kings	2,330	29.46%	5,438	68.76%	141	1.78%	-3,108	-39.30%	7,909	-2.19%
Clearlake	Lake	2,064	48.89%	1,998	47.32%	160	3.79%	66	1.56%	4,222	-12.12%
Lakeport	Lake	1,196	51.00%	1,081	46.10%	68	2.90%	115	4.90%	2,345	-3.38%
Unincorporated area	Lake	9,534	47.22%	10,082	49.93%	576	2.85%	-548	-2.71%	20,192	-7.19%
Susanville	Lassen	972	25.68%	2,698	71.28%	115	3.04%	-1,726	-45.60%	3,785	-2.54%
Unincorporated area	Lassen	1,506	19.85%	5,921	78.05%	159	2.10%	-4,415	-58.20%	7,586	-2.49%
Agoura Hills	Los Angeles	7,328	60.09%	4,553	37.33%	314	2.57%	2,775	22.76%	12,195	-5.38%
Alhambra	Los Angeles	18,939	63.99%	9,603	32.44%	1,057	3.57%	9,336	31.54%	29,599	-11.79%
Arcadia	Los Angeles	11,757	53.66%	9,384	42.83%	770	3.51%	2,373	10.83%	21,911	-10.17%
Artesia	Los Angeles	3,110	53.78%	2,492	43.09%	181	3.13%	618	10.69%	5,783	-14.74%
Avalon	Los Angeles	629	55.32%	473	41.60%	35	3.08%	156	13.72%	1,137	-7.79%
Azusa	Los Angeles	9,172	58.99%	5,870	37.75%	506	3.25%	3,302	21.24%	15,548	-14.52%
Baldwin Park	Los Angeles	12,258	62.83%	6,678	34.23%	575	2.95%	5,580	28.60%	19,511	-20.68%
Bell	Los Angeles	4,885	63.86%	2,445	31.96%	320	4.18%	2,440	31.90%	7,650	-28.61%
Bell Gardens	Los Angeles	5,371	65.09%	2,539	30.77%	342	4.14%	2,832	34.32%	8,252	-27.33%
Bellflower	Los Angeles	14,947	59.42%	9,505	37.78%	704	2.80%	5,442	21.63%	25,156	-15.09%
Beverly Hills	Los Angeles	8,123	46.60%	8,968	51.44%	342	1.96%	-845	-4.85%	17,433	-16.06%
Bradbury	Los Angeles	207	46.52%	223	50.11%	15	3.37%	-16	-3.60%	445	-8.40%
Burbank	Los Angeles	33,990	65.40%	16,395	31.55%	1,587	3.05%	17,595	33.85%	51,972	-3.43%
Calabasas	Los Angeles	7,477	57.78%	5,142	39.73%	322	2.49%	2,335	18.04%	12,941	-11.19%
Carson	Los Angeles	27,327	69.73%	10,882	27.77%	980	2.50%	16,445	41.96%	39,189	-10.05%
Cerritos	Los Angeles	14,398	57.78%	9,811	39.37%	711	2.85%	4,587	18.41%	24,920	-8.26%
Claremont	Los Angeles	12,277	66.34%	5,599	30.26%	630	3.40%	6,678	36.09%	18,506	-2.15%
Commerce	Los Angeles	2,813	65.89%	1,306	30.59%	150	3.51%	1,507	35.30%	4,269	-23.68%
Compton	Los Angeles	18,711	76.33%	5,065	20.66%	737	3.01%	13,646	55.67%	24,513	-19.91%
Covina	Los Angeles	11,540	54.97%	8,870	42.25%	583	2.78%	2,670	12.72%	20,993	-11.25%
Cudahy	Los Angeles	2,934	66.10%	1,330	29.96%	175	3.94%	1,604	36.13%	4,439	-26.93%
Culver City	Los Angeles	18,196	80.55%	3,593	15.90%	802	3.55%	14,603	64.64%	22,591	-3.77%
Diamond Bar	Los Angeles	11,800	51.75%	10,130	44.43%	871	3.82%	1,670	7.32%	22,801	-12.06%
Downey	Los Angeles	23,701	56.39%	16,859	40.11%	1,471	3.50%	6,842	16.28%	42,031	-18.83%
Duarte	Los Angeles	5,857	61.16%	3,402	35.52%	318	3.32%	2,455	25.63%	9,577	-10.44%
El Monte	Los Angeles	14,354	60.30%	8,715	36.61%	735	3.09%	5,639	23.69%	23,804	-18.68%
El Segundo	Los Angeles	6,218	63.42%	3,238	33.03%	348	3.55%	2,980	30.40%	9,804	0.77%
Gardena	Los Angeles	15,487	69.93%	5,991	27.05%	667	3.01%	9,496	42.88%	22,145	-10.24%
Glendale	Los Angeles	40,737	54.52%	31,459	42.10%	2,521	3.37%	9,278	12.42%	74,717	-7.30%
Glendora	Los Angeles	12,121	45.64%	13,571	51.10%	868	3.27%	-1,450	-5.46%	26,560	-4.93%
Hawaiian Gardens	Los Angeles	2,231	61.73%	1,272	35.20%	111	3.07%	959	26.54%	3,614	-20.27%
Hawthorne	Los Angeles	18,814	70.91%	6,752	25.45%	968	3.65%	12,062	45.46%	26,534	-13.43%
Hermosa Beach	Los Angeles	7,711	67.03%	3,425	29.77%	367	3.19%	4,286	37.26%	11,503	-4.20%
Hidden Hills	Los Angeles	573	53.90%	470	44.21%	20	1.88%	103	9.69%	1,063	-8.46%
Huntington Park	Los Angeles	7,762	67.66%	3,280	28.59%	430	3.75%	4,482	39.07%	11,472	-24.10%
Industry	Los Angeles	31	44.29%	36	51.43%	3	4.29%	-5	-7.14%	70	-6.00%
Inglewood	Los Angeles	31,645	82.45%	5,620	14.64%	1,116	2.91%	26,025	67.81%	38,381	-11.24%
Irwindale	Los Angeles	438	59.59%	262	35.65%	35	4.76%	176	23.95%	735	-16.37%
La Canada Flintridge	Los Angeles	7,078	59.39%	4,450	37.34%	389	3.26%	2,628	22.05%	11,917	-3.96%
La Habra Heights	Los Angeles	1,247	40.86%	1,731	56.72%	74	2.42%	-484	-15.86%	3,052	-5.27%
La Mirada	Los Angeles	10,937	49.14%	10,669	47.94%	651	2.92%	268	1.20%	22,257	-7.69%
La Puente	Los Angeles	6,813	62.67%	3,738	34.38%	321	2.95%	3,075	28.28%	10,872	-20.67%
La Verne	Los Angeles	8,289	47.50%	8,686	49.77%	476	2.73%	-397	-2.27%	17,451	-5.28%
Lakewood	Los Angeles	22,481	56.52%	16,112	40.51%	1,179	2.96%	6,369	16.01%	39,772	-6.91%
Lancaster	Los Angeles	29,461	52.71%	24,707	44.20%	1,726	3.09%	4,754	8.51%	55,894	-9.67%
Lawndale	Los Angeles	6,090	63.27%	3,155	32.78%	380	3.95%	2,935	30.49%	9,625	-16.57%
Lomita	Los Angeles	4,672	53.72%	3,692	42.45%	333	3.83%	980	11.27%	8,697	-8.33%
Long Beach	Los Angeles	120,322	68.35%	49,572	28.16%	6,138	3.49%	70,750	40.19%	176,032	-7.28%
Los Angeles	Los Angeles	976,781	70.12%	369,619	26.53%	46,697	3.35%	607,162	43.58%	1,393,097	-11.55%
Lynwood	Los Angeles	10,823	68.87%	4,342	27.63%	551	3.51%	6,481	41.24%	15,716	-25.66%
Malibu	Los Angeles	3,770	62.20%	2,088	34.45%	203	3.35%	1,682	27.75%	6,061	-6.60%
Manhattan Beach	Los Angeles	13,668	64.17%	7,005	32.89%	628	2.95%	6,663	31.28%	21,301	-4.01%
Maywood	Los Angeles	3,750	67.86%	1,606	29.06%	170	3.08%	2,144	38.80%	5,526	-24.03%
Monrovia	Los Angeles	11,165	63.09%	5,963	33.70%	568	3.21%	5,202	29.40%	17,696	-4.75%
Montebello	Los Angeles	13,569	64.70%	6,748	32.18%	655	3.12%	6,821	32.52%	20,972	-17.52%
Monterey Park	Los Angeles	11,905	60.39%	7,114	36.09%	694	3.52%	4,791	24.30%	19,713	-13.52%
Norwalk	Los Angeles	21,562	60.25%	13,080	36.55%	1,145	3.20%	8,482	23.70%	35,787	-17.16%
Palmdale	Los Angeles	29,853	55.47%	22,317	41.47%	1,651	3.07%	7,536	14.00%	53,821	-14.58%
Palos Verdes Estates	Los Angeles	4,632	54.11%	3,669	42.86%	259	3.03%	963	11.25%	8,560	-0.65%
Paramount	Los Angeles	8,953	66.56%	4,053	30.13%	445	3.31%	4,900	36.43%	13,451	-22.76%
Pasadena	Los Angeles	49,198	74.60%	14,383	21.81%	2,370	3.59%	34,815	52.79%	65,951	-3.37%
Pico Rivera	Los Angeles	15,028	64.94%	7,444	32.17%	668	2.89%	7,584	32.77%	23,140	-18.80%
Pomona	Los Angeles	25,937	60.60%	15,302	35.75%	1,564	3.65%	10,635	24.85%	42,803	-19.33%
Rancho Palos Verdes	Los Angeles	12,986	55.07%	9,730	41.26%	867	3.68%	3,256	13.81%	23,583	-3.69%
Redondo Beach	Los Angeles	24,875	65.23%	11,892	31.19%	1,366	3.58%	12,983	34.05%	38,133	-3.12%
Rolling Hills	Los Angeles	476	41.36%	647	56.21%	28	2.43%	-171	-14.86%	1,151	-3.02%
Rolling Hills Estates	Los Angeles	2,632	52.38%	2,231	44.40%	162	3.22%	401	7.98%	5,025	-5.05%
Rosemead	Los Angeles	7,597	57.81%	5,201	39.58%	344	2.62%	2,396	18.23%	13,142	-17.06%
San Dimas	Los Angeles	8,144	46.66%	8,774	50.27%	535	3.07%	-630	-3.61%	17,453	-6.21%
San Fernando	Los Angeles	4,687	65.31%	2,250	31.35%	239	3.33%	2,437	33.96%	7,176	-21.59%
San Gabriel	Los Angeles	7,379	59.13%	4,702	37.68%	398	3.19%	2,677	21.45%	12,479	-12.48%
San Marino	Los Angeles	3,689	56.21%	2,685	40.91%	189	2.88%	1,004	15.30%	6,563	-5.24%
Santa Clarita	Los Angeles	57,583	49.96%	54,413	47.21%	3,273	2.84%	3,170	2.75%	115,269	-5.39%
Santa Fe Springs	Los Angeles	4,435	59.71%	2,752	37.05%	240	3.23%	1,683	22.66%	7,427	-15.23%
Santa Monica	Los Angeles	40,425	78.49%	9,387	18.23%	1,692	3.29%	31,038	60.26%	51,504	-4.42%
Sierra Madre	Los Angeles	4,710	66.71%	2,134	30.23%	216	3.06%	2,576	36.49%	7,060	2.15%
Signal Hill	Los Angeles	3,463	69.12%	1,376	27.47%	171	3.41%	2,087	41.66%	5,010	-7.54%
South El Monte	Los Angeles	3,045	61.21%	1,775	35.68%	155	3.12%	1,270	25.53%	4,975	-24.18%
South Gate	Los Angeles	16,417	65.92%	7,602	30.53%	884	3.55%	8,815	35.40%	24,903	-24.10%
South Pasadena	Los Angeles	10,887	77.08%	2,683	19.00%	554	3.92%	8,204	58.09%	14,124	-2.09%
Temple City	Los Angeles	7,004	52.67%	5,899	44.36%	394	2.96%	1,105	8.31%	13,297	-13.43%
Torrance	Los Angeles	39,643	57.23%	27,230	39.31%	2,391	3.45%	12,413	17.92%	69,264	-4.78%
Vernon	Los Angeles	50	64.10%	26	33.33%	2	2.56%	24	30.77%	78	-5.31%
Walnut	Los Angeles	7,011	54.14%	5,480	42.32%	459	3.54%	1,531	11.82%	12,950	-12.65%
West Covina	Los Angeles	23,729	57.41%	16,440	39.77%	1,166	2.82%	7,289	17.63%	41,335	-14.15%
West Hollywood	Los Angeles	16,739	80.83%	3,428	16.55%	542	2.62%	13,311	64.28%	20,709	-1.50%
Westlake Village	Los Angeles	2,906	56.02%	2,155	41.55%	126	2.43%	751	14.48%	5,187	-2.58%
Whittier	Los Angeles	22,221	57.02%	15,632	40.11%	1,120	2.87%	6,589	16.91%	38,973	-10.82%
Unincorporated area	Los Angeles	220,523	61.47%	126,885	35.37%	11,321	3.16%	93,638	26.10%	358,729	-13.85%
Chowchilla	Madera	1,510	34.37%	2,768	62.99%	116	2.64%	-1,258	-28.63%	4,394	-6.09%
Madera	Madera	7,651	47.93%	7,910	49.55%	402	2.52%	-259	-1.62%	15,963	-19.40%
Unincorporated area	Madera	11,820	34.49%	21,666	63.23%	781	2.28%	-9,846	-28.73%	34,267	-4.28%
Belvedere	Marin	950	73.59%	306	23.70%	35	2.71%	644	49.88%	1,291	-2.13%
Corte Madera	Marin	5,032	83.04%	881	14.54%	147	2.43%	4,151	68.50%	6,060	-3.03%
Fairfax	Marin	4,443	86.78%	481	9.39%	196	3.83%	3,962	77.38%	5,120	-4.61%
Larkspur	Marin	6,403	82.27%	1,194	15.34%	186	2.39%	5,209	66.93%	7,783	-2.92%
Mill Valley	Marin	8,059	88.12%	852	9.32%	234	2.56%	7,207	78.81%	9,145	-2.67%
Novato	Marin	20,741	73.53%	6,731	23.86%	736	2.61%	14,010	49.67%	28,208	-2.53%
Ross	Marin	1,106	77.94%	270	19.03%	43	3.03%	836	58.91%	1,419	-1.13%
San Anselmo	Marin	7,177	86.80%	893	10.80%	198	2.39%	6,284	76.00%	8,268	-1.23%
San Rafael	Marin	21,899	80.89%	4,429	16.36%	745	2.75%	17,470	64.53%	27,073	-2.52%
Sausalito	Marin	3,966	83.23%	680	14.27%	119	2.50%	3,286	68.96%	4,765	-3.26%
Tiburon	Marin	4,311	77.70%	1,104	19.90%	133	2.40%	3,207	57.80%	5,548	-2.56%
Unincorporated area	Marin	32,065	81.32%	6,233	15.81%	1,135	2.88%	25,832	65.51%	39,433	-2.60%
Unincorporated area	Mariposa	3,622	38.09%	5,625	59.15%	262	2.76%	-2,003	-21.06%	9,509	-2.95%
Fort Bragg	Mendocino	2,025	69.42%	784	26.88%	108	3.70%	1,241	42.54%	2,917	-4.40%
Point Arena	Mendocino	153	75.74%	33	16.34%	16	7.92%	120	59.41%	202	-16.76%
Ukiah	Mendocino	3,727	60.37%	2,186	35.41%	261	4.23%	1,541	24.96%	6,174	-10.02%
Willits	Mendocino	1,143	57.84%	736	37.25%	97	4.91%	407	20.60%	1,976	-8.22%
Unincorporated area	Mendocino	17,001	60.83%	9,789	35.03%	1,157	4.14%	7,212	25.81%	27,947	-9.20%
Atwater	Merced	4,391	44.33%	5,294	53.45%	220	2.22%	-903	-9.12%	9,905	-13.35%
Dos Palos	Merced	746	44.99%	871	52.53%	41	2.47%	-125	-7.54%	1,658	-11.00%
Gustine	Merced	842	43.18%	1,067	54.72%	41	2.10%	-225	-11.54%	1,950	-11.59%
Livingston	Merced	2,201	52.09%	1,920	45.44%	104	2.46%	281	6.65%	4,225	-38.72%
Los Banos	Merced	7,043	51.96%	6,120	45.15%	391	2.88%	923	6.81%	13,554	-18.36%
Merced	Merced	14,469	53.60%	11,693	43.32%	830	3.07%	2,776	10.28%	26,992	-13.30%
Unincorporated area	Merced	10,498	37.35%	16,990	60.45%	620	2.21%	-6,492	-23.10%	28,108	-12.79%
Alturas	Modoc	294	26.39%	771	69.21%	49	4.40%	-477	-42.82%	1,114	-7.44%
Unincorporated area	Modoc	714	24.60%	2,113	72.81%	75	2.58%	-1,399	-48.21%	2,902	0.57%
Mammoth Lakes	Mono	1,996	65.68%	909	29.91%	134	4.41%	1,087	35.77%	3,039	-3.83%
Unincorporated area	Mono	1,526	50.45%	1,385	45.79%	114	3.77%	141	4.66%	3,025	0.48%
Carmel-by-the-Sea	Monterey	1,531	68.41%	645	28.82%	62	2.77%	886	39.59%	2,238	0.58%
Del Rey Oaks	Monterey	656	65.53%	314	31.37%	31	3.10%	342	34.17%	1,001	-1.02%
Gonzales	Monterey	1,338	61.69%	776	35.78%	55	2.54%	562	25.91%	2,169	-25.46%
Greenfield	Monterey	2,145	64.45%	1,107	33.26%	76	2.28%	1,038	31.19%	3,328	-29.25%
King City	Monterey	1,214	52.83%	1,020	44.39%	64	2.79%	194	8.44%	2,298	-27.87%
Marina	Monterey	6,307	66.76%	2,850	30.17%	290	3.07%	3,457	36.59%	9,447	-6.08%
Monterey	Monterey	9,189	70.96%	3,306	25.53%	454	3.51%	5,883	45.43%	12,949	-2.65%
Pacific Grove	Monterey	6,718	76.22%	1,818	20.63%	278	3.15%	4,900	55.59%	8,814	0.80%
Salinas	Monterey	25,561	62.20%	14,350	34.92%	1,187	2.89%	11,211	27.28%	41,098	-19.87%
Sand City	Monterey	109	63.01%	53	30.64%	11	6.36%	56	32.37%	173	3.37%
Seaside	Monterey	7,133	68.81%	2,905	28.02%	328	3.16%	4,228	40.79%	10,366	-8.32%
Soledad	Monterey	2,893	61.20%	1,699	35.94%	135	2.86%	1,194	25.26%	4,727	-28.46%
Unincorporated area	Monterey	28,266	58.75%	18,383	38.21%	1,461	3.04%	9,883	20.54%	48,110	-6.64%
American Canyon	Napa	6,276	65.06%	3,092	32.05%	279	2.89%	3,184	33.01%	9,647	-11.73%
Calistoga	Napa	1,517	73.07%	496	23.89%	63	3.03%	1,021	49.18%	2,076	-8.11%
Napa	Napa	25,184	67.40%	11,039	29.55%	1,140	3.05%	14,145	37.86%	37,363	-4.70%
St. Helena	Napa	2,091	72.81%	698	24.30%	83	2.89%	1,393	48.50%	2,872	-3.95%
Yountville	Napa	1,021	70.85%	391	27.13%	29	2.01%	630	43.72%	1,441	2.86%
Unincorporated area	Napa	7123	58.63%	4641	38.20%	386	3.18%	2482	20.43%	12150	-4.65%
Grass Valley	Nevada	3,909	57.30%	2,682	39.31%	231	3.39%	1,227	17.99%	6,822	-0.49%
Nevada City	Nevada	1,497	72.56%	461	22.35%	105	5.09%	1,036	50.22%	2,063	-4.73%
Truckee	Nevada	7,069	74.33%	2,172	22.84%	269	2.83%	4,897	51.49%	9,510	-1.59%
Unincorporated area	Nevada	21,309	48.72%	20,862	47.70%	1,566	3.58%	447	1.02%	43,737	-3.01%
Aliso Viejo	Orange	13,480	52.57%	11,273	43.96%	888	3.46%	2,207	8.61%	25,641	-6.58%
Anaheim	Orange	61,102	52.91%	50,626	43.84%	3,744	3.24%	10,476	9.07%	115,472	-10.34%
Brea	Orange	11,191	47.79%	11,494	49.08%	733	3.13%	-303	-1.29%	23,418	-4.27%
Buena Park	Orange	15,628	51.01%	14,093	46.00%	918	3.00%	1,535	5.01%	30,639	-10.01%
Costa Mesa	Orange	24,814	50.98%	22,273	45.76%	1,585	3.26%	2,541	5.22%	48,672	-9.34%
Cypress	Orange	11,986	49.80%	11,260	46.79%	821	3.41%	726	3.02%	24,067	-5.51%
Dana Point	Orange	8,988	45.47%	10,290	52.06%	489	2.47%	-1,302	-6.59%	19,767	-3.24%
Fountain Valley	Orange	13,545	45.96%	15,047	51.06%	878	2.98%	-1,502	-5.10%	29,470	-1.23%
Fullerton	Orange	30,882	53.60%	24,843	43.12%	1,895	3.29%	6,039	10.48%	57,620	-6.67%
Garden Grove	Orange	29,701	47.34%	31,341	49.95%	1,699	2.71%	-1,640	-2.61%	62,741	-3.70%
Huntington Beach	Orange	47,971	44.18%	57,545	53.00%	3,056	2.81%	-9,574	-8.82%	108,572	-5.59%
Irvine	Orange	70,220	58.35%	44,411	36.90%	5,718	4.75%	25,809	21.45%	120,349	-9.66%
La Habra	Orange	12,308	50.80%	11,283	46.57%	639	2.64%	1,025	4.23%	24,230	-10.64%
La Palma	Orange	3,881	52.33%	3,305	44.57%	230	3.10%	576	7.77%	7,416	-5.76%
Laguna Beach	Orange	9,107	61.11%	5,330	35.76%	466	3.13%	3,777	25.34%	14,903	-3.45%
Laguna Hills	Orange	7,665	48.23%	7,662	48.21%	566	3.56%	3	0.02%	15,893	-5.83%
Laguna Niguel	Orange	17,905	48.47%	17,898	48.45%	1,139	3.08%	7	0.02%	36,942	-4.69%
Laguna Woods	Orange	7,517	57.08%	5,415	41.12%	238	1.81%	2,102	15.96%	13,170	5.54%
Lake Forest	Orange	21,519	50.07%	19,955	46.44%	1,500	3.49%	1,564	3.64%	42,974	-3.34%
Los Alamitos	Orange	2,853	48.69%	2,809	47.94%	198	3.38%	44	0.75%	5,860	-5.14%
Mission Viejo	Orange	25,554	47.86%	26,094	48.87%	1,744	3.27%	-540	-1.01%	53,392	-2.99%
Newport Beach	Orange	19,937	40.22%	28,309	57.11%	1,320	2.66%	-8,372	-16.89%	49,566	-7.06%
Orange	Orange	30,384	49.89%	28,560	46.90%	1,953	3.21%	1,824	3.00%	60,897	-4.26%
Placentia	Orange	12,263	48.48%	12,189	48.18%	845	3.34%	74	0.29%	25,297	-5.35%
Rancho Santa Margarita	Orange	11,861	46.39%	12,941	50.62%	765	2.99%	-1,080	-4.22%	25,567	-2.25%
San Clemente	Orange	15,807	41.84%	20,986	55.54%	990	2.62%	-5,179	-13.71%	37,783	-3.82%
San Juan Capistrano	Orange	8,225	44.72%	9,684	52.65%	484	2.63%	-1,459	-7.93%	18,393	-4.37%
Santa Ana	Orange	48,934	60.36%	29,688	36.62%	2,446	3.02%	19,246	23.74%	81,068	-15.17%
Seal Beach	Orange	8,441	51.43%	7,567	46.11%	404	2.46%	874	5.33%	16,412	3.08%
Stanton	Orange	5,972	51.54%	5,323	45.94%	293	2.53%	649	5.60%	11,588	-8.78%
Tustin	Orange	17,602	55.84%	12,695	40.27%	1,224	3.88%	4,907	15.57%	31,521	-8.34%
Villa Park	Orange	1,379	35.50%	2,398	61.72%	108	2.78%	-1,019	-26.23%	3,885	-4.01%
Westminster	Orange	16,506	44.26%	19,850	53.23%	935	2.51%	-3,344	-8.97%	37,291	0.18%
Yorba Linda	Orange	14,899	37.58%	23,339	58.86%	1,412	3.56%	-8,440	-21.29%	39,650	-3.80%
Unincorporated area	Orange	31,704	44.76%	37,039	52.29%	2,096	2.96%	-5,335	-7.53%	70,839	-2.84%
Auburn	Placer	4,159	49.84%	3,947	47.30%	239	2.86%	212	2.54%	8,345	-3.41%
Colfax	Placer	364	38.60%	543	57.58%	36	3.82%	-179	-18.98%	943	-10.84%
Lincoln	Placer	13,838	43.48%	17,205	54.06%	783	2.46%	-3,367	-10.58%	31,826	0.26%
Loomis	Placer	1,331	31.93%	2,726	65.40%	111	2.66%	-1,395	-33.47%	4,168	-5.67%
Rocklin	Placer	17,454	45.20%	19,992	51.77%	1,172	3.03%	-2,538	-6.57%	38,618	-1.68%
Roseville	Placer	38,645	47.13%	40,830	49.79%	2,527	3.08%	-2,185	-2.66%	82,002	-1.25%
Unincorporated area	Placer	28,167	40.88%	38,698	56.16%	2,042	2.96%	-10,531	-15.28%	68,907	-3.17%
Portola	Plumas	335	39.79%	488	57.96%	19	2.26%	-153	-18.17%	842	-3.12%
Unincorporated area	Plumas	3,685	39.95%	5,237	56.77%	303	3.28%	-1,552	-16.82%	9,225	0.07%
Banning	Riverside	5,935	47.07%	6,367	50.50%	306	2.43%	-432	-3.43%	12,608	-5.86%
Beaumont	Riverside	11,088	44.51%	13,249	53.19%	573	2.30%	-2,161	-8.68%	24,910	-7.27%
Blythe	Riverside	1,355	38.98%	2,041	58.72%	80	2.30%	-686	-19.74%	3,476	-10.56%
Calimesa	Riverside	1,964	33.25%	3,815	64.60%	127	2.15%	-1,851	-31.34%	5,906	-2.80%
Canyon Lake	Riverside	1,469	21.35%	5,319	77.30%	93	1.35%	-3,850	-55.95%	6,881	-4.14%
Cathedral City	Riverside	13,143	67.60%	5,953	30.62%	345	1.77%	7,190	36.98%	19,441	-5.27%
Coachella	Riverside	5,673	62.05%	3,219	35.21%	250	2.73%	2,454	26.84%	9,142	-31.53%
Corona	Riverside	28,553	44.82%	32,419	50.89%	2,734	4.29%	-3,866	-6.07%	63,706	-11.32%
Desert Hot Springs	Riverside	4,831	56.95%	3,461	40.80%	191	2.25%	1,370	16.15%	8,483	-13.89%
Eastvale	Riverside	12,785	46.35%	13,972	50.66%	825	2.99%	-1,187	-4.30%	27,582	-14.48%
Hemet	Riverside	14,169	46.24%	15,738	51.36%	734	2.40%	-1,569	-5.12%	30,641	-5.57%
Indian Wells	Riverside	1,240	43.13%	1,604	55.79%	31	1.08%	-364	-12.66%	2,875	8.04%
Indio	Riverside	16,580	53.35%	13,883	44.67%	613	1.97%	2,697	8.68%	31,076	-12.83%
Jurupa Valley	Riverside	15,577	47.85%	16,064	49.35%	913	2.80%	-487	-1.50%	32,554	-19.25%
La Quinta	Riverside	9,815	49.25%	9,736	48.86%	376	1.89%	79	0.40%	19,927	-1.55%
Lake Elsinore	Riverside	11,772	44.42%	14,034	52.95%	698	2.63%	-2,262	-8.53%	26,504	-9.84%
Menifee	Riverside	22,823	42.43%	29,734	55.28%	1,232	2.29%	-6,911	-12.85%	53,789	-1.70%
Moreno Valley	Riverside	35,688	57.66%	24,473	39.54%	1,738	2.81%	11,215	18.12%	61,899	-18.33%
Murrieta	Riverside	20,227	39.81%	29,353	57.77%	1,234	2.43%	-9,126	-17.96%	50,814	-4.90%
Norco	Riverside	3,155	27.21%	8,192	70.65%	249	2.15%	-5,037	-43.44%	11,596	-6.47%
Palm Desert	Riverside	14,329	53.65%	11,877	44.47%	501	1.88%	2,452	9.18%	26,707	1.58%
Palm Springs	Riverside	19,678	80.01%	4,596	18.69%	320	1.30%	15,082	61.32%	24,594	5.23%
Perris	Riverside	11,477	57.94%	7,759	39.17%	571	2.88%	3,718	18.77%	19,807	-24.86%
Rancho Mirage	Riverside	7,364	62.60%	4,211	35.80%	189	1.61%	3,153	26.80%	11,764	10.17%
Riverside	Riverside	56,392	51.95%	48,550	44.72%	3,614	3.33%	7,842	7.22%	108,556	-12.30%
San Jacinto	Riverside	7,346	46.85%	7,904	50.41%	429	2.74%	-558	-3.56%	15,679	-15.22%
Temecula	Riverside	22,957	43.50%	28,410	53.84%	1,405	2.66%	-5,453	-10.33%	52,772	-2.67%
Wildomar	Riverside	5,799	35.89%	9,948	61.57%	409	2.53%	-4,149	-25.68%	16,156	-5.37%
Unincorporated area	Riverside	68,598	42.72%	87,796	54.68%	4,166	2.59%	-19,198	-11.96%	160,560	-6.78%
Citrus Heights	Sacramento	17,703	45.53%	20,068	51.61%	1,114	2.86%	-2,365	-6.08%	38,885	-1.38%
Elk Grove	Sacramento	47,054	57.39%	31,951	38.97%	2,979	3.63%	15,103	18.42%	81,984	-8.66%
Folsom	Sacramento	22,438	51.22%	19,635	44.82%	1,734	3.96%	2,803	6.40%	43,807	-0.52%
Galt	Sacramento	4,428	39.71%	6,415	57.52%	309	2.77%	-1,987	-17.82%	11,152	-8.67%
Isleton	Sacramento	143	51.25%	131	46.95%	5	1.79%	12	4.30%	279	1.81%
Rancho Cordova	Sacramento	17,547	54.01%	13,889	42.75%	1,050	3.23%	3,658	11.26%	32,486	-3.79%
Sacramento	Sacramento	143,577	70.90%	51,309	25.34%	7,627	3.77%	92,268	45.56%	202,513	-7.10%
Unincorporated area	Sacramento	128,674	52.41%	108,742	44.29%	8,104	3.30%	19,932	8.12%	245,520	-4.28%
Hollister	San Benito	9,486	59.04%	6,089	37.90%	492	3.06%	3,397	21.14%	16,067	-15.28%
San Juan Bautista	San Benito	686	64.17%	345	32.27%	38	3.55%	341	31.90%	1,069	-7.30%
Unincorporated area	San Benito	5,007	47.63%	5,268	50.11%	238	2.26%	-261	-2.48%	10,513	-6.49%
Adelanto	San Bernardino	4,366	54.33%	3,476	43.26%	194	2.41%	890	11.08%	8,036	-24.21%
Apple Valley	San Bernardino	10,910	34.59%	19,878	63.02%	756	2.40%	-8,968	-28.43%	31,544	-4.49%
Barstow	San Bernardino	2,538	41.38%	3,387	55.22%	209	3.41%	-849	-13.84%	6,134	-12.89%
Big Bear Lake	San Bernardino	864	40.54%	1,219	57.20%	48	2.25%	-355	-16.66%	2,131	4.27%
Chino	San Bernardino	16,914	47.45%	17,818	49.99%	911	2.56%	-904	-2.54%	35,643	-12.46%
Chino Hills	San Bernardino	16,281	46.27%	17,851	50.73%	1,056	3.00%	-1,570	-4.46%	35,188	-10.91%
Colton	San Bernardino	8,581	57.45%	5,932	39.72%	423	2.83%	2,649	17.74%	14,936	-18.23%
Fontana	San Bernardino	38,761	54.74%	30,001	42.37%	2,042	2.88%	8,760	12.37%	70,804	-20.25%
Grand Terrace	San Bernardino	2,631	46.38%	2,871	50.61%	171	3.01%	-240	-4.23%	5,673	-10.95%
Hesperia	San Bernardino	12,119	37.14%	19,728	60.47%	780	2.39%	-7,609	-23.32%	32,627	-11.75%
Highland	San Bernardino	9,129	47.47%	9,563	49.72%	541	2.81%	-434	-2.26%	19,233	-13.51%
Loma Linda	San Bernardino	5,040	53.94%	3,981	42.61%	322	3.45%	1,059	11.33%	9,343	-6.11%
Montclair	San Bernardino	6,241	57.39%	4,299	39.53%	335	3.08%	1,942	17.86%	10,875	-18.53%
Needles	San Bernardino	566	38.50%	861	58.57%	43	2.93%	-295	-20.07%	1,470	1.63%
Ontario	San Bernardino	31,462	54.36%	24,887	43.00%	1,526	2.64%	6,575	11.36%	57,875	-18.01%
Rancho Cucamonga	San Bernardino	36,694	46.63%	39,683	50.43%	2,311	2.94%	-2,989	-3.80%	78,688	-9.50%
Redlands	San Bernardino	17,753	51.33%	15,742	45.52%	1,090	3.15%	2,011	5.81%	34,585	-5.03%
Rialto	San Bernardino	18,417	58.78%	12,056	38.48%	861	2.75%	6,361	20.30%	31,334	-22.23%
San Bernardino	San Bernardino	29,841	55.68%	22,248	41.51%	1,509	2.82%	7,593	14.17%	53,598	-19.57%
Twentynine Palms	San Bernardino	2,334	43.66%	2,833	52.99%	179	3.35%	-499	-9.33%	5,346	-4.33%
Upland	San Bernardino	17,449	48.72%	17,262	48.20%	1,102	3.08%	187	0.52%	35,813	-9.51%
Victorville	San Bernardino	19,040	50.09%	17,968	47.27%	1,003	2.64%	1,072	2.82%	38,011	-15.01%
Yucaipa	San Bernardino	8,360	31.53%	17,553	66.21%	599	2.26%	-9,193	-34.67%	26,512	-6.36%
Yucca Valley	San Bernardino	3,543	38.52%	5,410	58.82%	244	2.65%	-1,867	-20.30%	9,197	-1.60%
Unincorporated area	San Bernardino	42,280	39.47%	61,909	57.80%	2,929	2.73%	-19,629	-18.32%	107,118	-8.03%
Carlsbad	San Diego	39,377	57.08%	27,665	40.10%	1,948	2.82%	11,712	16.98%	68,990	-0.58%
Chula Vista	San Diego	66,770	57.22%	47,064	40.33%	2,850	2.44%	19,706	16.89%	116,684	-14.26%
Coronado	San Diego	4,868	52.28%	4,212	45.23%	232	2.49%	656	7.04%	9,312	-0.23%
Del Mar	San Diego	1,723	62.47%	970	35.17%	65	2.36%	753	27.30%	2,758	-1.98%
El Cajon	San Diego	15,236	42.07%	20,093	55.48%	888	2.45%	-4,857	-13.41%	36,217	-9.58%
Encinitas	San Diego	24,513	64.43%	12,346	32.45%	1,189	3.13%	12,167	31.98%	38,048	-4.03%
Escondido	San Diego	29,285	52.21%	25,162	44.86%	1,644	2.93%	4,123	7.35%	56,091	-5.75%
Imperial Beach	San Diego	4,679	51.19%	4,219	46.15%	243	2.66%	460	5.03%	9,141	-12.68%
La Mesa	San Diego	18,449	61.97%	10,398	34.93%	925	3.11%	8,051	27.04%	29,772	-2.29%
Lemon Grove	San Diego	6,560	59.31%	4,196	37.94%	304	2.75%	2,364	21.37%	11,060	-10.56%
National City	San Diego	9,482	57.77%	6,468	39.41%	463	2.82%	3,014	18.36%	16,413	-17.38%
Oceanside	San Diego	44,960	54.24%	35,575	42.92%	2,349	2.83%	9,385	11.32%	82,884	-3.07%
Poway	San Diego	13,735	51.04%	12,391	46.05%	783	2.91%	1,344	4.99%	26,909	0.40%
San Diego	San Diego	398,290	65.19%	192,801	31.56%	19,852	3.25%	205,489	33.63%	610,943	-5.78%
San Marcos	San Diego	23,134	54.96%	17,628	41.88%	1,333	3.17%	5,506	13.08%	42,095	-3.78%
Santee	San Diego	12,855	42.57%	16,583	54.92%	758	2.51%	-3,728	-12.35%	30,196	-0.97%
Solana Beach	San Diego	5,084	63.65%	2,659	33.29%	244	3.05%	2,425	30.36%	7,987	-2.31%
Vista	San Diego	20,697	53.83%	16,635	43.27%	1,117	2.91%	4,062	10.56%	38,449	-6.51%
Unincorporated area	San Diego	101,675	41.70%	136,205	55.86%	5,957	2.44%	-34,530	-14.16%	243,837	-4.22%
San Francisco	San Francisco	323,719	80.33%	62,594	15.53%	16,651	4.13%	261,125	64.80%	402,964	-7.75%
Escalon	San Joaquin	1,050	29.81%	2,392	67.92%	80	2.27%	-1,342	-38.10%	3,522	-6.62%
Lathrop	San Joaquin	6,425	53.27%	5,269	43.69%	367	3.04%	1,156	9.58%	12,061	-21.60%
Lodi	San Joaquin	10,229	39.04%	15,198	58.01%	774	2.95%	-4,969	-18.96%	26,201	-8.73%
Manteca	San Joaquin	15,707	45.84%	17,629	51.45%	929	2.71%	-1,922	-5.61%	34,265	-13.10%
Ripon	San Joaquin	2,438	29.40%	5,659	68.25%	195	2.35%	-3,221	-38.84%	8,292	-5.55%
Stockton	San Joaquin	50,800	56.80%	35,902	40.14%	2,729	3.05%	14,898	16.66%	89,431	-17.36%
Tracy	San Joaquin	18,183	53.16%	14,724	43.05%	1,299	3.80%	3,459	10.11%	34,206	-16.96%
Mountain House	San Joaquin	4,198	54.11%	3,047	39.28%	513	6.61%	1,151	14.84%	7,758	N/A (Note: City not incorporated until after 2020 election.)
Unincorporated area	San Joaquin	17,617	36.75%	29,176	60.87%	1,142	2.38%	-11,559	-24.11%	47,935	-17.05%
Arroyo Grande	San Luis Obispo	5,802	53.06%	4,800	43.90%	333	3.05%	1,002	9.16%	10,935	-2.23%
Atascadero	San Luis Obispo	8,125	48.71%	8,038	48.19%	518	3.11%	87	0.52%	16,681	-0.98%
El Paso de Robles	San Luis Obispo	6,806	46.44%	7,476	51.01%	375	2.56%	-670	-4.57%	14,657	-2.33%
Grover Beach	San Luis Obispo	3,391	53.62%	2,726	43.11%	207	3.27%	665	10.52%	6,324	-0.79%
Morro Bay	San Luis Obispo	4,246	61.98%	2,396	34.97%	209	3.05%	1,850	27.00%	6,851	-1.56%
Pismo Beach	San Luis Obispo	2,787	52.32%	2,389	44.85%	151	2.83%	398	7.47%	5,327	-1.12%
San Luis Obispo	San Luis Obispo	17,724	72.64%	5,768	23.64%	907	3.72%	11,956	49.00%	24,399	-3.58%
Unincorporated area	San Luis Obispo	32,433	49.45%	31,339	47.78%	1,820	2.77%	1,094	1.67%	65,592	-1.56%
Atherton	San Mateo	2,741	70.64%	1,046	26.96%	93	2.40%	1,695	43.69%	3,880	-2.31%
Belmont	San Mateo	10,615	76.13%	2,863	20.53%	466	3.34%	7,752	55.59%	13,944	-4.13%
Brisbane	San Mateo	1,798	75.99%	467	19.74%	101	4.27%	1,331	56.26%	2,366	-5.48%
Burlingame	San Mateo	11,311	73.94%	3,486	22.79%	500	3.27%	7,825	51.15%	15,297	-6.40%
Colma	San Mateo	408	70.83%	145	25.17%	23	3.99%	263	45.66%	576	-14.71%
Daly City	San Mateo	23,506	69.42%	9,264	27.36%	1,090	3.22%	14,242	42.06%	33,860	-13.78%
East Palo Alto	San Mateo	5,094	77.11%	1,282	19.41%	230	3.48%	3,812	57.71%	6,606	-17.58%
Foster City	San Mateo	10,130	71.70%	3,439	24.34%	560	3.96%	6,691	47.36%	14,129	-7.00%
Half Moon Bay	San Mateo	4,811	73.92%	1,506	23.14%	191	2.93%	3,305	50.78%	6,508	-3.15%
Hillsborough	San Mateo	4,175	65.58%	1,981	31.12%	210	3.30%	2,194	34.46%	6,366	-4.52%
Menlo Park	San Mateo	13,308	81.10%	2,583	15.74%	519	3.16%	10,725	65.36%	16,410	-5.87%
Millbrae	San Mateo	6,723	63.04%	3,480	32.63%	462	4.33%	3,243	30.41%	10,665	-12.85%
Pacifica	San Mateo	15,244	72.81%	5,010	23.93%	684	3.27%	10,234	48.88%	20,938	-6.26%
Portola Valley	San Mateo	2,425	79.46%	541	17.73%	86	2.82%	1,884	61.73%	3,052	-1.49%
Redwood City	San Mateo	26,362	76.51%	6,950	20.17%	1,142	3.31%	19,412	56.34%	34,454	-6.74%
San Bruno	San Mateo	12,554	68.11%	5,167	28.03%	710	3.85%	7,387	40.08%	18,431	-10.96%
San Carlos	San Mateo	13,779	78.08%	3,372	19.11%	496	2.81%	10,407	58.97%	17,647	-2.22%
San Mateo	San Mateo	33,546	74.57%	10,001	22.23%	1,439	3.20%	23,545	52.34%	44,986	-5.42%
South San Francisco	San Mateo	18,234	70.06%	6,924	26.60%	870	3.34%	11,310	43.45%	26,028	-12.20%
Woodside	San Mateo	2,533	72.14%	864	24.61%	114	3.25%	1,669	47.54%	3,511	-0.80%
Unincorporated area	San Mateo	23,660	76.68%	6,245	20.24%	951	3.08%	17,415	56.44%	30,856	-4.11%
Buellton	Santa Barbara	1,502	53.32%	1,240	44.02%	75	2.66%	262	9.30%	2,817	-3.73%
Carpinteria	Santa Barbara	4,553	69.32%	1,789	27.24%	226	3.44%	2,764	42.08%	6,568	-4.22%
Goleta	Santa Barbara	11,336	69.35%	4,417	27.02%	592	3.62%	6,919	42.33%	16,345	-4.22%
Guadalupe	Santa Barbara	1,196	55.73%	900	41.94%	50	2.33%	296	13.79%	2,146	-23.62%
Lompoc	Santa Barbara	7,087	52.33%	6,041	44.61%	415	3.06%	1,046	7.72%	13,543	-7.85%
Santa Barbara	Santa Barbara	33,409	76.41%	8,880	20.31%	1,432	3.28%	24,529	56.10%	43,721	-4.43%
Santa Maria	Santa Barbara	13,087	49.37%	12,678	47.82%	745	2.81%	409	1.54%	26,510	-14.88%
Solvang	Santa Barbara	1,748	53.29%	1,432	43.66%	100	3.05%	316	9.63%	3,280	0.73%
Unincorporated area	Santa Barbara	40,231	57.65%	27,493	39.40%	2,061	2.95%	12,738	18.25%	69,785	-1.59%
Campbell	Santa Clara	14,189	70.50%	5,135	25.51%	803	3.99%	9,054	44.98%	20,127	-4.77%
Cupertino	Santa Clara	17,455	69.90%	6,416	25.69%	1,100	4.41%	11,039	44.21%	24,971	-7.90%
Gilroy	Santa Clara	14,623	61.78%	8,319	35.15%	727	3.07%	6,304	26.63%	23,669	-10.83%
Los Altos	Santa Clara	14,112	77.67%	3,426	18.86%	631	3.47%	10,686	58.81%	18,169	-2.70%
Los Altos Hills	Santa Clara	3,643	70.92%	1,281	24.94%	213	4.15%	2,362	45.98%	5,137	-3.15%
Los Gatos	Santa Clara	12,958	70.41%	4,764	25.89%	682	3.71%	8,194	44.52%	18,404	-1.95%
Milpitas	Santa Clara	15,857	61.27%	8,974	34.68%	1,049	4.05%	6,883	26.60%	25,880	-10.89%
Monte Sereno	Santa Clara	1,456	65.12%	695	31.08%	85	3.80%	761	34.03%	2,236	-2.65%
Morgan Hill	Santa Clara	13,778	61.70%	7,856	35.18%	697	3.12%	5,922	26.52%	22,331	-4.95%
Mountain View	Santa Clara	25,698	79.26%	5,529	17.05%	1,197	3.69%	20,169	62.20%	32,424	-5.04%
Palo Alto	Santa Clara	27,372	80.26%	5,411	15.87%	1,320	3.87%	21,961	64.40%	34,103	-5.59%
San Jose	Santa Clara	246,439	66.10%	112,717	30.23%	13,651	3.66%	133,722	35.87%	372,807	-8.39%
Santa Clara	Santa Clara	29,440	67.97%	11,471	26.48%	2,404	5.55%	17,969	41.48%	43,315	-9.39%
Saratoga	Santa Clara	12,193	68.56%	4,866	27.36%	726	4.08%	7,327	41.20%	17,785	-4.93%
Sunnyvale	Santa Clara	38,459	72.22%	12,664	23.78%	2,126	3.99%	25,795	48.44%	53,249	-7.31%
Unincorporated area	Santa Clara	23,072	64.40%	11,400	31.82%	1,354	3.78%	11,672	32.58%	35,826	-7.43%
Capitola	Santa Cruz	4,338	75.85%	1,196	20.91%	185	3.23%	3,142	54.94%	5,719	-2.31%
Santa Cruz	Santa Cruz	26,279	83.98%	3,660	11.70%	1,353	4.32%	22,619	72.28%	31,292	-3.19%
Scotts Valley	Santa Cruz	5,172	69.89%	1,997	26.99%	231	3.12%	3,175	42.91%	7,400	-1.54%
Watsonville	Santa Cruz	10,014	70.36%	3,771	26.49%	448	3.15%	6,243	43.86%	14,233	-19.90%
Unincorporated area	Santa Cruz	55,195	73.11%	17,354	22.99%	2,942	3.90%	37,841	50.13%	75,491	-5.11%
Anderson	Shasta	1,250	28.49%	3,018	68.79%	119	2.71%	-1,768	-40.30%	4,387	-3.75%
Redding	Shasta	15,243	34.29%	27,979	62.94%	1,233	2.77%	-12,736	-28.65%	44,455	-2.78%
Shasta Lake	Shasta	1,512	31.61%	3,158	66.01%	114	2.38%	-1,646	-34.41%	4,784	-3.93%
Unincorporated area	Shasta	9,125	25.87%	25,384	71.96%	765	2.17%	-16,259	-46.09%	35,274	-3.90%
Loyalton	Sierra	96	27.99%	240	69.97%	7	2.04%	-144	-41.98%	343	-9.00%
Unincorporated area	Sierra	545	38.63%	826	58.54%	40	2.83%	-281	-19.91%	1,411	-1.43%
Dorris	Siskiyou	69	28.05%	172	69.92%	5	2.03%	-103	-41.87%	246	-6.98%
Dunsmuir	Siskiyou	421	57.99%	264	36.36%	41	5.65%	157	21.63%	726	-1.50%
Etna	Siskiyou	118	34.81%	215	63.42%	6	1.77%	-97	-28.61%	339	2.81%
Fort Jones	Siskiyou	99	32.78%	191	63.25%	12	3.97%	-92	-30.46%	302	-3.59%
Montague	Siskiyou	170	27.60%	438	71.10%	8	1.30%	-268	-43.51%	616	2.00%
Mt. Shasta	Siskiyou	1,074	57.62%	700	37.55%	90	4.83%	374	20.06%	1,864	-6.52%
Tulelake	Siskiyou	50	35.97%	85	61.15%	4	2.88%	-35	-25.18%	139	-3.98%
Weed	Siskiyou	404	46.71%	427	49.36%	34	3.93%	-23	-2.66%	865	-4.87%
Yreka	Siskiyou	1,183	35.98%	2,004	60.95%	101	3.07%	-821	-24.97%	3,288	-1.92%
Unincorporated area	Siskiyou	4,741	36.18%	7,965	60.78%	398	3.04%	-3,224	-24.60%	13,104	-3.56%
Benicia	Solano	11,031	67.36%	4,840	29.55%	506	3.09%	6,191	37.80%	16,377	-2.65%
Dixon	Solano	4,438	46.10%	4,909	51.00%	279	2.90%	-471	-4.89%	9,626	-9.43%
Fairfield	Solano	28,259	61.65%	16,080	35.08%	1,496	3.26%	12,179	26.57%	45,835	-8.49%
Rio Vista	Solano	3,965	59.75%	2,519	37.96%	152	2.29%	1,446	21.79%	6,636	5.42%
Suisun City	Solano	7,236	64.32%	3,697	32.86%	317	2.82%	3,539	31.46%	11,250	-10.77%
Vacaville	Solano	22,211	49.76%	21,263	47.64%	1,161	2.60%	948	2.12%	44,635	-3.61%
Vallejo	Solano	32,935	71.37%	11,860	25.70%	1,351	2.93%	21,075	45.67%	46,146	-9.47%
Unincorporated area	Solano	3,922	42.04%	5,177	55.49%	230	2.47%	-1,255	-13.45%	9,329	-3.68%
Cloverdale	Sonoma	2,657	63.81%	1,388	33.33%	119	2.86%	1,269	30.48%	4,164	-8.54%
Cotati	Sonoma	2,820	70.64%	1,011	25.33%	161	4.03%	1,809	45.32%	3,992	-6.93%
Healdsburg	Sonoma	4,784	77.31%	1,224	19.78%	180	2.91%	3,560	57.53%	6,188	1.38%
Petaluma	Sonoma	25,035	73.23%	8,020	23.46%	1,132	3.31%	17,015	49.77%	34,187	-3.60%
Rohnert Park	Sonoma	14,158	66.64%	6,386	30.06%	703	3.31%	7,772	36.58%	21,247	-7.91%
Santa Rosa	Sonoma	60,231	72.82%	19,715	23.84%	2,768	3.35%	40,516	48.98%	82,714	-5.65%
Sebastopol	Sonoma	3,917	82.88%	615	13.01%	194	4.10%	3,302	69.87%	4,726	-4.94%
Sonoma	Sonoma	4,986	75.88%	1,438	21.88%	147	2.24%	3,548	53.99%	6,571	-2.72%
Windsor	Sonoma	8,884	63.95%	4,579	32.96%	430	3.10%	4,305	30.99%	13,893	-8.03%
Unincorporated area	Sonoma	52,128	70.69%	19,050	25.83%	2,566	3.48%	33,078	44.86%	73,744	-4.91%
Ceres	Stanislaus	7,175	47.92%	7,367	49.21%	430	2.87%	-192	-1.28%	14,972	-21.41%
Hughson	Stanislaus	1,097	32.60%	2,198	65.32%	70	2.08%	-1,101	-32.72%	3,365	-9.14%
Modesto	Stanislaus	37,437	47.90%	38,545	49.32%	2,171	2.78%	-1,108	-1.42%	78,153	-9.48%
Newman	Stanislaus	1,793	46.89%	1,908	49.90%	123	3.22%	-115	-3.01%	3,824	-17.38%
Oakdale	Stanislaus	3,335	31.75%	6,929	65.96%	241	2.29%	-3,594	-34.21%	10,505	-6.18%
Patterson	Stanislaus	4,567	56.48%	3,295	40.75%	224	2.77%	1,272	15.73%	8,086	-16.49%
Riverbank	Stanislaus	4,090	43.52%	5,086	54.12%	222	2.36%	-996	-10.60%	9,398	-15.58%
Turlock	Stanislaus	11,354	40.97%	15,646	56.46%	711	2.57%	-4,292	-15.49%	27,711	-11.89%
Waterford	Stanislaus	1,080	33.23%	2,097	64.52%	73	2.25%	-1,017	-31.29%	3,250	-9.49%
Unincorporated area	Stanislaus	13,419	35.12%	23,915	62.59%	874	2.29%	-10,496	-27.47%	38,208	-11.46%
Live Oak	Sutter	1,296	39.90%	1,859	57.24%	93	2.86%	-563	-17.33%	3,248	-22.08%
Yuba City	Sutter	9,331	35.61%	16,228	61.93%	644	2.46%	-6,897	-26.32%	26,203	-17.53%
Unincorporated area	Sutter	2,389	24.17%	7,285	73.70%	211	2.13%	-4,896	-49.53%	9,885	-5.52%
Corning	Tehama	749	37.39%	1,195	59.66%	59	2.95%	-446	-22.27%	2,003	-6.11%
Red Bluff	Tehama	1,706	33.42%	3,242	63.51%	157	3.08%	-1,536	-30.09%	5,105	-7.13%
Tehama	Tehama	70	36.27%	119	61.66%	4	2.07%	-49	-25.39%	193	-4.03%
Unincorporated area	Tehama	4,890	25.43%	13,947	72.52%	394	2.05%	-9,057	-47.10%	19,231	-5.81%
Unincorporated area	Trinity	2,449	43.38%	2,979	52.77%	217	3.84%	-530	-9.39%	5,645	-4.00%
Dinuba	Tulare	2,663	46.01%	2,986	51.59%	139	2.40%	-323	-5.58%	5,788	-25.83%
Exeter	Tulare	1,141	30.18%	2,555	67.57%	85	2.25%	-1,414	-37.40%	3,781	-7.20%
Farmersville	Tulare	1,048	51.02%	947	46.11%	59	2.87%	101	4.92%	2,054	-23.83%
Lindsay	Tulare	1,205	54.13%	984	44.20%	37	1.66%	221	9.93%	2,226	-23.42%
Porterville	Tulare	6,290	41.85%	8,376	55.72%	365	2.43%	-2,086	-13.88%	15,031	-13.55%
Tulare	Tulare	7,653	37.31%	12,399	60.45%	458	2.23%	-4,746	-23.14%	20,510	-12.29%
Visalia	Tulare	20,550	38.91%	30,970	58.64%	1,294	2.45%	-10,420	-19.73%	52,814	-9.78%
Woodlake	Tulare	891	54.36%	701	42.77%	47	2.87%	190	11.59%	1,639	-24.54%
Unincorporated area	Tulare	11,780	34.22%	21,936	63.72%	712	2.07%	-10,156	-29.50%	34,428	-14.04%
Sonora	Tuolumne	1,108	47.31%	1,157	49.40%	77	3.29%	-49	-2.09%	2,342	-6.16%
Unincorporated area	Tuolumne	9,801	37.03%	16,053	60.65%	614	2.32%	-6,252	-23.62%	26,468	-2.78%
Camarillo	Ventura	20,539	52.81%	17,268	44.40%	1,085	2.79%	3,271	8.41%	38,892	-1.39%
Fillmore	Ventura	3,432	53.47%	2,796	43.56%	190	2.96%	636	9.91%	6,418	-17.39%
Moorpark	Ventura	9,878	52.97%	8,196	43.95%	576	3.09%	1,682	9.02%	18,650	-4.48%
Ojai	Ventura	3,139	70.18%	1,192	26.65%	142	3.17%	1,947	43.53%	4,473	-0.47%
Oxnard	Ventura	39,146	64.60%	19,691	32.50%	1,757	2.90%	19,455	32.11%	60,594	-13.70%
Port Hueneme	Ventura	4,545	61.39%	2,612	35.28%	246	3.32%	193	26.11%	7,403	-8.40%
San Buenaventura	Ventura	35,168	61.32%	20,360	35.50%	1,819	3.17%	14,808	25.82%	57,347	-3.17%
Santa Paula	Ventura	6,155	59.41%	3,905	37.69%	300	2.90%	2,250	21.72%	10,360	-15.44%
Simi Valley	Ventura	30,687	46.53%	33,425	50.68%	1,844	2.80%	-2,738	-4.15%	65,956	-5.04%
Thousand Oaks	Ventura	39,082	55.21%	29,742	42.02%	1,958	2.77%	9,340	13.20%	70,782	-2.36%
Unincorporated area	Ventura	25,653	54.91%	19,714	42.20%	1,353	2.90%	5,939	12.71%	46,720	-5.06%
Davis	Yolo	26,115	83.58%	3,960	12.67%	1,172	3.75%	22,155	70.90%	31,247	-1.77%
West Sacramento	Yolo	13,149	59.54%	8,145	36.88%	791	3.58%	5,004	22.66%	22,085	-5.46%
Winters	Yolo	1,951	54.60%	1,505	42.12%	117	3.27%	446	12.48%	3,573	-8.49%
Woodland	Yolo	14,334	56.93%	9,901	39.33%	942	3.74%	4,433	17.61%	25,177	-9.73%
Unincorporated area	Yolo	5,856	55.73%	4,333	41.24%	318	3.03%	1,523	14.50%	10,507	3.06%
Marysville	Yuba	1,458	36.19%	2,434	60.41%	137	3.40%	-976	-24.22%	4,029	-7.25%
Wheatland	Yuba	499	29.60%	1,135	67.32%	52	3.08%	-636	-37.72%	1,686	-1.00%
Unincorporated area	Yuba	8,768	36.00%	14,922	61.27%	665	2.73%	-6,154	-25.27%	24,355	-3.79%
Totals		9,276,179	58.48% (Note: Statewide candidate vote percentages and the total vote number differ here because California's Supplement to Statement of Vote does not count write in votes as part of the city totals.)	6,081,697	38.34%	504,660	3.18%	3,194,482	20.14%	15,862,536	-9.03%

===== Cities and unincorporated areas that flipped from Democratic to Republican =====
- Atwater (Merced)
- Avenal (Kings)
- Banning (Riverside)
- Beverly Hills (Los Angeles)
- Bradbury (Los Angeles)
- Brawley (Imperial)
- Brea (Orange)
- Calipatria (Imperial)
- Ceres (Stanislaus)
- Chino (San Bernardino)
- Chino Hills (San Bernardino)
- Corcoran (Kings)
- Corona (Riverside)
- Crescent City (Del Norte)
- Dinuba (Tulare)
- Dixon (Solano)
- Dos Palos (Merced)
- Eastvale (Riverside)
- Fowler (Fresno)
- Garden Grove (Orange)
- Grand Terrace (San Bernardino)
- Gustine (Merced)
- Hemet (Riverside)
- Highland (San Bernardino)
- Holtville (Imperial)
- Imperial (Imperial)
- Jurupa Valley (Riverside)
- Kerman (Fresno)
- La Verne (Los Angeles)
- Lake Elsinore (Riverside)
- Live Oak (Sutter)
- Madera (Madera)
- Manteca (San Joaquin)
- Mission Viejo (Orange)
- Modesto (Stanislaus)
- Newman (Stanislaus)
- Rancho Cucamonga (San Bernardino)
- Reedley (Fresno)
- Riverbank (Stanislaus)
- San Dimas (Los Angeles)
- San Jacinto (Riverside)
- Shafter (Kern)
- Simi Valley (Ventura)
- Sonora (Tuolumne)
- Unincorporated area of Imperial
- Unincorporated area of Lake
- Unincorporated area of San Benito
- Wasco (Kern)
- Weed (Siskiyou)

== Analysis ==
California remained strongly blue, voting to the left of all states except Hawaii, Maryland, Massachusetts, Vermont, and the District of Columbia. However, the state had one of the largest rightward shifts in the country, shifting 9% to the right, compared to the national swing of about 6% in this election. Other highly populous blue states also swung significantly rightward in 2024, including New York (by 11%), New Jersey (by 10%), Massachusetts (by 8%), and Illinois (by 6%).

Trump flipped 10 counties that were won by Biden in 2020: Butte, Fresno, Imperial, Inyo, Lake, Merced, Riverside, San Bernardino, San Joaquin, and Stanislaus. Of these 10, all except Butte and Inyo were also won by Hillary Clinton in 2016. Trump's wins in Fresno, Merced, Riverside, San Bernardino, San Joaquin, and Stanislaus marked the first time they voted for a Republican since George W. Bush in 2004, although all are fairly consistently Republican at the state level.

Despite these results, Harris was able to hold onto historically Republican Orange County by a narrow plurality, making it the third election in a row since 1936 that the county has voted Democrat. As a result, Harris also became the first Democrat ever to win Orange County without winning the national popular vote. Orange is one of the highest-income counties, supporting exit polls showing that Harris gained among high-income voters. Harris also won every coastal county except for Del Norte County. She is also the first Democrat since John Kerry to win California despite carrying a minority of counties, winning 25 out of 58.

=== County swings ===
57 of California's 58 counties swung right, the only exception being Alpine County, which has an extremely low population and thus frequently swings wildly. Trump's win in Imperial (which is over 80% Hispanic) marked the first time it voted Republican since George H. W. Bush in 1988. Imperial is the most Hispanic county in California, mostly Mexican American, and shifted rightward by 25.23 percentage points. Imperial is home to Calexico, across the border from Mexicali, the capital of Baja California in Mexico. Trump received 40% of the vote in Calexico, the highest percentage since 1972.

Imperial County had the third-largest swing to Trump of any county in the country, behind Maverick County, Texas (27.95%) and Webb County, Texas (25.43%), two other majority-Hispanic counties along the Mexico–United States border.

Trump's win in Lake marked the first time it voted Republican since Ronald Reagan in 1984. Trump was also the first Republican since George W. Bush in 2004 to win at least 30% in Los Angeles County. Trump managed to flip four congressional districts, two of which split tickets and elected Democrats. Trump's gains with Hispanics allowed him to cross 40% in Southern California, becoming the first Republican to do so since 2004, as the region trended to the right of the state as a whole. Trump's gains among Hispanics in California also helped improve his margins in the state, also allowing him to carry 9 of the state's 11 Hispanic majority counties. In contrast to the number of counties that switched from Democratic to Republican in this cycle, none flipped in the opposite direction.

Trump also gained ground with Asian American voters in California, with Asian Americans being almost entirely responsible for the rightward shift in areas lacking significant Hispanic populations, such as San Francisco. Some of the most heavily Asian American counties in the country, including Alameda County (32% Asian), Santa Clara County (39% Asian), San Mateo County (30% Asian), and the city of San Francisco (34% Asian), all swung significantly rightward.

In majority-Chinese Arcadia and Temple City, both communities in the San Gabriel Valley, Harris's margin dropped by 10% and 13% respectively. Trump also gained in mostly Filipino Daly City by 15%. Trump became the first Republican since 2004 to win the Inland Empire, California's third largest metropolitan area and a blue collar majority-Hispanic region that had been economically struggling.

Trump achieved significant gains in Los Angeles, receiving 27% of the vote, the highest for a Republican candidate in the city since 1988. This was a marked improvement from 2020, when Trump garnered only 21%, and 2016, when he received just 16% of the vote in the city. According to the New York Times 2024 precinct map, Trump's substantial gains in Los Angeles were largely attributed to increased support in Hispanic and Asian neighborhoods, although he made gains in nearly every single precinct in the city regardless. These communities, which have traditionally leaned Democratic, showed growing support for Trump, especially in areas where economic concerns, cultural values, and opposition to some policies of the Democratic Party resonated with voters. Trump also saw an increase in Latino support in California, garnering 38% of the Latino vote, compared to 29% in the 2020 election, according to Fox News voter analysis. Trump won 42% of Latino men compared to Harris's 54%, and won 34% of Latina women compared to Harris's 63%—both major improvements from 2020.

=== Statewide trends ===
Harris underperformed Biden's 2020 total by nearly 2 million, losing over 600,000 votes in Los Angeles County alone. By contrast, Trump narrowly surpassed his vote total from 2020, solidifying his base of support in the state at just over 6 million votes; this marked his third-highest vote total from any state in the country in 2024, only behind 6.4 million in Texas and 6.1 million in Florida.

The swing in the presidential contest was part of a broad rightward swing in California. This included a broad rejection of progressive ballot measures and a near-universal swing against progressive local candidates, including several successful recall elections. Republican U.S. Senate candidate Steve Garvey was one of the few Republican U.S. Senate candidates that outran Donald Trump, receiving over 230,000 more votes than Trump in the concurrent 2024 United States Senate elections in California, while Democrat Adam Schiff received about 240,000 fewer votes than Harris. This trend was attributed to Garvey's name recognition, especially among Hispanics, due to his former status as a celebrity baseball player.

== See also ==
- United States presidential elections in California
- 2024 United States presidential election
- 2024 California elections
- 2024 Democratic Party presidential primaries
- 2024 Republican Party presidential primaries
- 2024 United States elections
