= 2024 California Proposition 5 =

Proposition 5
- ALLOWS LOCAL BONDS FOR AFFORDABLE HOUSING AND PUBLIC INFRASTRUCTURE WITH 55% VOTER APPROVAL. LEGISLATIVE CONSTITUTIONAL AMENDMENT.

Results
Choice	Votes	%
Yes	6,640,122	44.96%
No	8,129,819	55.04%

No
90–100%
80–90%
70–80%
60–70%
50–60%
Yes
90–100%
80–90%
70–80%
60–70%
50–60%

Proposition 5 is a California ballot proposition that was voted on as part of the 2024 California elections on November 5. It failed, with 55.0% of voters voting "no." If passed, the proposition would have amended the California Constitution to reduce the supermajority requirement from two-thirds of the vote to 55% for local bond measures to fund affordable housing and some types of public infrastructure.

== Background ==
Most city and county bonds require voter approval in California, needing the support of at least two-thirds of voters to pass. This requirement was put in place by Proposition 13 which was passed in 1978 and reduced property taxes.

In 2000, Proposition 39 reduced the supermajority to 55% to approve taxes for local school bonds. According to the California Policy Center, a conservative think tank, since Proposition 39 was passed, voters in California have decided on almost 1,150 school bond measures and have approved 911 of them.

== Proposition ==
Proposition 5 was placed on the ballot via legislative referral. The legislation, called ACA 1, was authored by Cecilia Aguiar-Curry, Marc Berman, Matt Haney, Alex Lee, and Buffy Wicks. It passed the California State Assembly on September 6, 2023 by 55 votes to 12, with 13 members not voting. It passed the California State Senate on September 14, 2023 by 29 votes to 10, with one senator (Josh Newman) not voting.

Proposition 5 would have allowed a city, county or special district in California to issue bonds with 55% voter approval, so long as the bonds were to fund affordable housing, permanent supportive housing, or public infrastructure. The proposition would have gone into effect immediately if it had passed, meaning local bonds voted on at the November elections would only have needed 55% approval to pass.

Politico suggested that a lower supermajority would mean more bond measures would pass, but also that more local governments would put them on the ballot to begin with.

== Campaign ==
The proposition's ballot label was challenged by the Howard Jarvis Taxpayers Association who argued that it lacked important information that the proposition would reduce the supermajority rather than raising it. Sacramento County Superior Court judge Shelleyanne W. L. Chang agreed and ordered the state government to rewrite the label. The Third District Court of Appeal reversed Chang's ruling, finding that the ballot label was "factually accurate" and would not mislead voters.

=== Support ===
Supporters of the proposition said that it gave local voters the power to address challenges facing their communities. They suggested that Proposition 5 would make it easier for cities to fund their projects, such as affordable housing, safer streets initiatives, or additional fire stations.

Supporters also argued that allowing just a third of voters to block measures is undemocratic.

==== Endorsements ====
'Yes'

US Representatives

- Barbara Lee, US representative for California (1998–2025)

State and local politicians

- Cecilia Aguiar-Curry, Assembly Majority Leader (2023–present), Assembly member for California's 4th assembly district (2016–present)
- Holly Mitchell, member of Los Angeles County Board of Supervisors (2020–present)
- Rex Richardson, mayor of Long Beach, California (2022–present)

Newspapers

- Los Angeles Times

Organisations

- ACLU Northern California
- ACLU Southern California
- AIDS Healthcare Foundation
- Asian Pacific Environmental Network
- Association of Bay Area Governments
- Bay Area Council
- California-Hawaii State Conference of the NAACP
- California Democratic Party
- California State Association of Counties
- California Teachers Association
- CHIRLA Action Fund
- Clean Water Action
- Equality California
- Greenbelt Alliance
- Heal the Bay
- Inclusive Action for the City
- League of California Cities
- League of United Latin American Citizens of California
- League of Women Voters of California
- PICO California
- PolicyLink
- San Francisco AIDS Foundation
- San Francisco Foundation
- Save the Bay Action Fund
- Silicon Valley Community Foundation

=== Opposition ===
Those opposing the proposition argued that the proposition would make it easier for bond debt to increase, leading to higher property taxes. It was also argued that Proposition 5 was an attempt by Democrats to dodge property tax restrictions under Proposition 13.

They additionally highlighted that the proposition's wording, which they argued allowed a wide interpretation of what is an infrastructure project.

==== Endorsements ====
"No"

Newspapers

- San Diego Union-Tribune
- San Francisco Chronicle

Organisations

- California Chamber of Commerce
- California Republican Party
- Howard Jarvis Taxpayers Association
- Libertarian Party of California
- National Federation of Independent Businesses
- Peace and Freedom Party

=== Neutral/no endorsement ===
Neutral/no endorsement

Organisations

- California Environmental Voters (Note: Politico recorded this organisation as "not saying" on Proposition 5)
- Planned Parenthood
- Sierra Club

== Polling ==
Poll source	Date(s) administered	Sample size (Note: Key: A – all adults RV – registered voters LV – likely voters V – unclear)	Margin of error	Yes	No	Undecided
Public Policy Institute of California	October 7–15, 2024	1137 (LV)	± 3.7%	48%	50%	3%
USC/CSU Long Beach/Cal Poly Pomona	September 12–25, 2024	1,685 (LV)	± 2.4%	43%	35%	22%
Public Policy Institute of California	August 29–September 9, 2024	1071 (LV)	± 3.7%	49%	50%	1%

== Results ==
The proposition failed, with 8,129,819 voters (55.0%) voting "no" and 6,640,122 voters (44.0%) voting "yes". The Associated Press projected that Proposition 5 had failed on 8 November.

== See also ==
- 2024 United States ballot measures
- List of California ballot propositions
