= 2024 California Proposition 35 =

Proposition 35
- November 5, 2024
- Managed Care Organization Tax Authorization Initiative; Make permanent the existing tax on managed health care insurance plans, which, if approved by the federal government, provides revenues to pay for Medi-Cal health care services.

Results
Choice	Votes	%
Yes	9,574,836	67.77%
No	4,553,423	32.23%
Valid votes	14,128,259	100.00%
Invalid or blank votes	0	0.00%
Total votes	14,128,259	100.00%

Yes
90–100%
80–90%
70–80%
60–70%
50–60%
No
90–100%
80–90%
70–80%
60–70%
50–60%

Proposition 35, titled Managed Care Organization Tax Authorization Initiative, was a successful California ballot proposition in the 2024 general election on November 5. The proposition makes permanent an existing tax on managed health care insurance plans to fund Medi-Cal services pending federal approval.

== Support ==
In the official argument, supporters argued that Proposition 35 provides needed funding for medical care without adding taxes and ensuring that revenues are only spent on healthcare purposes. The proposition was supported by Planned Parenthood, the California Medical Association, and pediatricians.

Supporters

State legislators

- Toni Atkins, former president pro tempore of the California State Senate (2018–2024) from the 39th district (2016–2024) and candidate for California governor in 2026
- Tina McKinnor, state assemblywoman for the 61st District (2022–present)

Notable individuals

- Antonio Villaraigosa, former Mayor of Los Angeles (2005–2013) and candidate for California governor in 2018 and 2026

Organizations

- California Dental Association
- California Hospital Association
- California Medical Association
- California Primary Care Association
- Planned Parenthood Affiliates of California

Political parties

- California Democratic Party
- California Republican Party

Newspapers and publications

- The Sacramento Bee

== Opposition ==
No official argument against Proposition 35 was submitted to the California Secretary of State and no opponents were listed on the ballot. The oppose side did not establish an official campaign and raised $0.

Despite the lack of official opposition, opponents to Proposition 35 cite the lack of flexibility in how revenues from the existing tax can be spent and potential funding cuts to healthcare.

Opponents

State officials

- Gavin Newsom, Governor of California (2019–present)

Notable individuals

- Betty Yee, former state controller (2015–2023)

Organizations

- League of Women Voters of California
- California Pan-Ethnic Health Network
- California Alliance for Retired Americans
- Courage California
- Western Center on Law and Poverty

Newspapers and publications

- East Bay Times/Mercury News
- San Francisco Chronicle
- San Diego Union-Tribune
- The Orange County Register
- Los Angeles Times

== Polling ==
Poll source	Date(s) administered	Sample size (Note: Key: A – all adults RV – registered voters LV – likely voters V – unclear)	Margin of error	Yes	No	Undecided
Public Policy Institute of California	October 7–15, 2024	1,137 (LV)	± 3.7%	62%	36%	2%
Public Policy Institute of California	August 29 – September 9, 2024	1,071 (LV)	± 3.7%	63%	34%	2%

== Results ==
The proposition passed with over 9 million (over 67 percent) "yes" votes and around 4 million (32 percent) "no" votes.

== See also ==
- 2024 United States ballot measures
- List of California ballot propositions
