= 2024 California Proposition 2 =

- November 5, 2024
- Authorizing Bonds for Public Schools and Community College Facilities

Results
Choice	Votes	%
Yes	5,752,647	57.04%
No	4,333,475	42.96%
Valid votes	10,086,122	100.00%
Invalid or blank votes	0	0.00%
Total votes	10,086,122	100.00%

Yes
90–100%
80–90%
70–80%
60–70%
50–60%
No
90–100%
80–90%
70–80%
60–70%
50–60%
- Source: California Secretary of State

Proposition 2, titled Authorizing Bonds for Public Schools and Community College Facilities, was a California ballot proposition and legislative statutes that passed in the 2024 general election on November 5, 2024. The proposition authorized the issuance of $10 billion in state general obligation bonds for repair, upgrade, and construction of facilities at K–12 public schools and community colleges; this also includes charter schools throughout the state of California.

The proposition also allowed for the authorization of the following:

- Funding for new facilities, to improve school health and safety conditions at existing facilities, and for classroom upgrades (e.g., science, engineering, transitional kindergarten, and vocational classrooms).
- Expansion of eligibility for financial hardship grants for small and disadvantaged school districts.
- Higher percentage of state matching funds to schools demonstrating greatest need.
- Mandatory public hearings and performance audits.
- Appropriation of money from General Fund to repay bonds.

== Supporters ==
The official support statement of the proposition argues that "many schools and community colleges are outdated and need basic health and safety repairs and upgrades to prepare students for college and careers and to retain and attract quality teachers. Prop. 2 meets those needs and requires strict taxpayer accountability so funds are spent as promised with local control."

Supporters

State assemblymembers

- Al Muratsuchi, state assemblyman from the 66th district (2016–present; 2012–2014)

Labor unions

- California Teachers Association

Political parties

- California Democratic Party
- California Republican Party

== Opponents ==
The official oppositional statement of the proposition argues that "Proposition 2 will increase our bond obligations by $10 billion, which will cost taxpayers an estimated $18 billion when repaid with interest. A bond works like a government credit card—paying off that credit card requires the government to spend more of your tax dollars! Vote NO on Prop. 2."

Opponents

State assemblymembers

- Bill Essayli, state assemblyman from the 63rd district (2022–2025)

Newspapers

- Daily Breeze
- Inland Valley Daily Bulletin
- Long Beach Press-Telegram
- Los Angeles Daily News
- Orange County Register
- Pasadena Star-News
- Redlands Daily Facts
- The Press-Enterprise
- The San Bernardino Sun
- San Gabriel Valley Tribune
- Whittier Daily News

Political parties

- Libertarian Party of California
- Peace and Freedom Party

Organizations

- Howard Jarvis Taxpayers Association

== Polling ==
Poll source	Date(s) administered	Sample size (Note: Key: A – all adults RV – registered voters LV – likely voters V – unclear)	Margin of error	Yes	No	Undecided
Public Policy Institute of California	October 7–15, 2024	1,137 (LV)	± 3.7%	52%	46%	2%
University of Southern California/CSU Long Beach/Cal Poly Pomona	September 12–25, 2024	1,685 (LV)	± 2.4%	54%	28.5%	17.5%
Public Policy Institute of California	August 29 – September 9, 2024	1,071 (LV)	± 3.7%	54%	44%	2%

== Results ==
Associated Press called a "yes" vote on Proposition 2. As of November 7, 2024, AP reported that reported that 56.9% voting yes and 43.1% voting no, with 54% of votes counted.

== See also ==
- 2024 United States ballot measures
- List of California ballot propositions
