= 2024 California Proposition 4 =

Proposition 4
- November 5, 2024
- Authorizing bonds for safe drinking water, wildlife prevention, and protecting communities and natural lands from climate risks Authorizes $10 billion in general obligation bonds for water, wildfire prevention, and protection of communities and lands. Requires annual audits. Increased state costs of about $400 million annually for 40 years to repay the bond.

Results
Choice	Votes	%
Yes	5,791,642	58.17%
No	4,164,004	41.83%
Valid votes	9,955,646	100.00%
Invalid or blank votes	0	0.00%
Total votes	9,955,646	100.00%

Yes
90–100%
80–90%
70–80%
60–70%
50–60%
No
90–100%
80–90%
70–80%
60–70%
50–60%
- Source: California Secretary of State

Proposition 4, titled Authorizing bonds for safe drinking water, wildlife prevention, and protecting communities and natural lands from climate risks, was a California ballot proposition and legislative statute that passed by vote in the 2024 general election on November 5, 2024.

The proposition "authorize[d] $10 billion in general obligation bonds for water, wildfire prevention, and protection of communities and lands."

== Polling ==
Poll source	Date(s) administered	Sample size (Note: Key: A – all adults RV – registered voters LV – likely voters V – unclear)	Margin of error	Yes	No	Undecided
Public Policy Institute of California	October 7–15, 2024	1,137 (LV)	± 3.7%	60%	38%	2%
University of Southern California/CSU Long Beach/Cal Poly Pomona	September 12–25, 2024	1,685 (LV)	± 2.4%	60%	24%	16%
Public Policy Institute of California	August 29 – September 9, 2024	1,071 (LV)	± 3.7%	65%	33%	2%

== Aftermath ==
Despite the pitch being for new expenditures to be funded by the proposition, over $275 million in Prop 4 funds have been used to backfill the state's general fund. California lawmakers have faced criticism for using a significant amount of Proposition 4 funds as pork, including $16 million for a conservation easement for a private ranch in Santa Barbara, $40 million to secure access to a private beach, and $1 million for an alternative meat research facility at UC Davis.

The 2025-2026 California Spending Plan sets forth the broad allocations of the proceeds of the bonds with $3.5 billion allocated for the first year implementation:

1. Safe Drinking Water, Drought, Flood and Water Resilience - $1.2 billion of $3.8 billion;
2. Wildfire and Forest Resilience - $598 million of $1.5 billion;
3. Coastal Resilience - $279 million of $1.2 billion;
4. Biodiversity and Nature-Based Climate Solutions - $390 million of $1.2 billion;
5. Clean Energy - $275 million of $850 million;
6. Park Creation and Outdoor Access - $466 million of $700 million;
7. Extreme Heat Mitigation - $110million of $450 million; and
8. Climate Smart Agriculture- $153 million of $300 million

== See also ==
- 2024 United States ballot measures
- List of California ballot propositions
