= 2024 California elections =

- November 5, 2024
- Registered: 22,595,659
- Turnout: 69.07% (▲18.27 pp)

Elections were held in California on November 5, 2024, with the statewide direct primary election being held on March 5, 2024.

California voters elected all of California's seats to the United States House of Representatives, one seat to the United States Senate, all of the seats of the California State Assembly, and all odd-numbered seats of the California State Senate. Additionally, they voted indirectly in the nationwide 2024 presidential election.

Pursuant to Proposition 14 passed in 2010, California uses a nonpartisan blanket primary for almost all races, with the presidential primary races being the notable exception. Under the nonpartisan blanket primary system, all the candidates for the same elected office, regardless of respective political party, run against each other at once during the primary. The candidates receiving the most and second-most votes in the primary election then become the contestants in the general election.

== President of the United States ==
California has 54 votes in the Electoral College following the results of the 2020 census in which the state lost one vote due to redistricting. California is considered a strong blue state, voting for each Democratic Party candidate since 1992; in 2020, Joe Biden carried the state with 63.5% of the vote, the highest vote share of any candidate since 1936.

Presidential primaries were held in California on Super Tuesday, March 5, 2024. All six of the state's registered political parties held primary elections. California is a semi-closed primary state, in which independent voters may choose which party primary to vote in.

=== Primary results ===
2024 California Democratic pres. primary
Candidate	Votes	%	Delegates
Joe Biden (incumbent)	3,207,687	89.15	424
Marianne Williamson	146,356	4.07	0
Dean Phillips	100,284	2.79	0
Armando Perez-Serrato	43,105	1.20	0
Gabriel Cornejo	41,390	1.15	0
"President" R. Boddie	25,455	0.71	0
Stephen P. Lyons	21,062	0.59	0
Eban Cambridge	12,758	0.35	0
Write-in votes	29	<0.01	—
Total	3,598,126	100%	424

California Republican primary, March 5, 2024
Candidate	Votes	Percentage	Actual delegate count		
Candidate	Votes	Percentage	Bound	Unbound	Total
Donald Trump	1,962,905	79.25%	169	0	169
Nikki Haley	431,876	17.44%	0	0	0
Ron DeSantis (withdrawn)	35,717	1.44%	0	0	0
Chris Christie (withdrawn)	20,210	0.82%	0	0	0
Vivek Ramaswamy (withdrawn)	11,113	0.45%	0	0	0
Rachel Swift	4,253	0.17%	0	0	0
David Stuckenberg	3,909	0.16%	0	0	0
Ryan Binkley (withdrawn)	3,577	0.14%	0	0	0
Asa Hutchinson (withdrawn)	3,336	0.13%	0	0	0
Total:	2,476,896	100.00%	169	0	169

=== General election ===
2024 United States presidential election in California
Party	Candidate	Votes	%	±%
Democratic	Kamala Harris; Tim Walz	9,276,179	58.47%	−5.01
Republican	Donald Trump; JD Vance	6,081,697	38.33%	+4.01
American Independent	Robert F. Kennedy Jr. (withdrawn); Nicole Shanahan (withdrawn)	197,645	1.25%	+0.91
Green	Jill Stein; Butch Ware	167,814	1.06%	+0.60
Peace and Freedom	Claudia De la Cruz; Karina Garcia	72,539	0.46%	+0.17
Libertarian	Chase Oliver; Mike ter Maat	66,662	0.42%	−0.65
Write-In	Peter Sonski; Lauren Onak	2,939	0.02%	+0.01
Total votes		15,865,475	100.0%	
Democratic win				

== United States Congress ==
=== Senate ===
Following the death of Dianne Feinstein on September 29, 2023, incumbent Democratic senator Laphonza Butler was appointed to the seat by Governor Gavin Newsom. She has chosen not to run for a full term.

There were two elections on the ballot for the same Class 1 seat: a special election for the remainder of Feinstein's term expiring on January 3, 2025, and a regular election for the full term ending on January 3, 2031. Democratic U.S. representative Adam Schiff and Republican former baseball player Steve Garvey advanced to the general election in both the regular and special elections.

==== Special election ====
2024 United States Senate special election in California
Primary election
Party	Candidate	Votes	%
Republican	Steve Garvey	2,455,115	33.25
Democratic	Adam Schiff	2,160,171	29.25
Democratic	Katie Porter	1,272,684	17.24
Democratic	Barbara Lee	866,551	11.74
Republican	Eric Early	451,274	6.11
Democratic	Christina Pascucci	109,867	1.49
Democratic	Sepi Gilani	68,497	0.93
Write-in		27	0.00
Total votes		7,384,186	100.0
General election
Democratic	Adam Schiff	8,837,051	58.75
Republican	Steve Garvey	6,204,637	41.25
Total votes		15,041,688	100.00
Democratic hold			

==== Regular election ====
2024 United States Senate election in California
Primary election
Party	Candidate	Votes	%
Democratic	Adam Schiff	2,304,829	31.57
Republican	Steve Garvey	2,301,351	31.52
Democratic	Katie Porter	1,118,429	15.32
Democratic	Barbara Lee	717,129	9.82
Republican	Eric Early	242,055	3.32
Republican	James Bradley	98,778	1.35
Democratic	Christina Pascucci	61,998	0.85
Republican	Sharleta Bassett	54,884	0.75
Republican	Sarah Sun Liew	38,718	0.53
No party preference	Laura Garza	34,529	0.47
Republican	Jonathan Reiss	34,400	0.47
Democratic	Sepi Gilani	34,316	0.47
Libertarian	Gail Lightfoot	33,295	0.46
Republican	Denice Gary-Pandol	25,649	0.35
Republican	James Macauley	23,296	0.32
Democratic	Harmesh Kumar	21,624	0.30
Democratic	David Peterson	21,170	0.29
Democratic	Douglas Pierce	19,458	0.27
No party preference	Major Singh	17,092	0.23
Democratic	John Rose	14,627	0.20
Democratic	Perry Pound	14,195	0.19
Democratic	Raji Rab	13,640	0.19
No party preference	Mark Ruzon	13,488	0.18
American Independent	Forrest Jones	13,140	0.18
Republican	Stefan Simchowitz	12,773	0.17
Republican	Martin Veprauskas	9,795	0.13
No party preference	Don Grundmann	6,641	0.09
Write-in		18	0.00
Total votes		7,301,317	100.0
General election
Democratic	Adam Schiff	9,036,252	58.87
Republican	Steve Garvey	6,312,594	41.13
Total votes		15,348,846	100.00
Democratic hold			

=== House of Representatives ===
All of California's 52 seats to the United States House of Representatives will be up for election to two-year terms. Six members of Congress have chosen not to run for re-election, three of whom (Barbara Lee, Katie Porter, and Adam Schiff) chose instead to run in the aforementioned U.S. Senate election.

A special election was held for California's 20th congressional district on March 19, 2024, following the resignation of Kevin McCarthy. State legislator Vince Fong won the May 21 runoff, defeating Tulare County sheriff Mike Boudreaux.

== State legislature ==
=== State Senate ===
All odd-numbered seats of the California State Senate are up for election to four-year terms. 10 senators are term-limited in 2024, while Democrat Dave Min retired early to run for Congress.

=== State Assembly ===
All 80 seats of the California State Assembly are up for election to two-year terms. Eight assemblymembers are term-limited in 2024, and 14 are retiring early to run for another office.

== State propositions ==
=== Primary election ===
Since the enactment of a November 2011 law, only state propositions placed on the ballot by the state legislature may appear on the primary ballot, and all qualifying measures placed via petition are automatically moved to the general election ballot. Only one of these have been put on the 2024 primary ballot:

- Proposition 1, the Behavioral Health Services Program and Bond Measure, will provide additional behavioral health services and issue up to about $6.4 billion in bonds to fund housing for homeless individuals and veterans. The measure would also, among others, shift roughly $140 million annually of existing tax revenue for existing mental health, drug, and alcohol treatment care from the counties to the state so the counties could focus more on housing and personalized support services. Supporters of Proposition 1 favor this proposed expansion of behavioral health and addiction services, along with the additional housing for the homeless. Opponents of the measure object to the shift in spending that could cut existing county mental health programs, along with the resulting additional bond debt.

2024 California Proposition 1
Choice	Votes	%
For	3,636,734	50.18
Against	3,610,511	49.82
Total	7,247,245	100.00
Source: California Secretary of State

=== General election ===
The state legislature put five propositions on the general election ballot, while five others were put on via petition.

2024 California propositions (November)
Name	Description	Votes				Type
Name	Description	Yes	%	No	%	Type
Proposition 2	Issues $10 billion in bonds to fund construction and modernization of public education facilities.	8,820,842	58.70	6,207,390	41.30	Bond issue
Proposition 3	Repeals Proposition 8, effectively allowing same-sex couples to once again marry.	9,477,435	62.62	5,658,187	37.38	Legislatively referred constitutional amendment
Proposition 4	Issues $10 billion in bonds to fund various water infrastructure, energy, and environmental protection projects.	9,055,116	59.80	6,086.414	40.20	Bond issue
Proposition 5	Lowers the vote threshold from two-thirds to 55% for local bond measures to fund affordable housing projects and public infrastructure.	6,738,890	44.99	8,239,337	55.01	Legislatively referred constitutional amendment
Proposition 6	Removes involuntary servitude as punishment for a crime from the state constitution.	6,895,604	46.66	7,882,137	53.34	Legislatively referred constitutional amendment
Proposition 32	Raises the state minimum wage to $18 per hour by 2026.	7,469,803	49.29	7,686,126	50.71	Citizen-initiated state statute
Proposition 33	Repeals the Costa–Hawkins Rental Housing Act of 1995, allowing cities to once again establish their own rent controls.	5,979,880	39.98	8,975,542	60.02	Citizen-initiated state statute
Proposition 34	Requires health care providers to spend 98% of revenues from federal discount prescription drug programs on direct patient care.	7,378,686	50.89	7,121,317	49.11	Citizen-initiated state statute
Proposition 35	Permanently authorizes a tax on managed care organizations to fund Medi-Cal programs.	10,124,174	67.91	4,783,434	32.09	Citizen-initiated state statute
Proposition 36	Increases penalties for certain drug crimes and theft convictions and allows a new class of crime to be called treatment-mandated felony.	10,307,296	68.42	4,756,612	31.58	Citizen-initiated state statute
Source: California Secretary of State

== See also ==
- 2024 United States elections
