= Inclusive Action for the City =

Non-profit CDFI in Los Angeles, California, U.S.

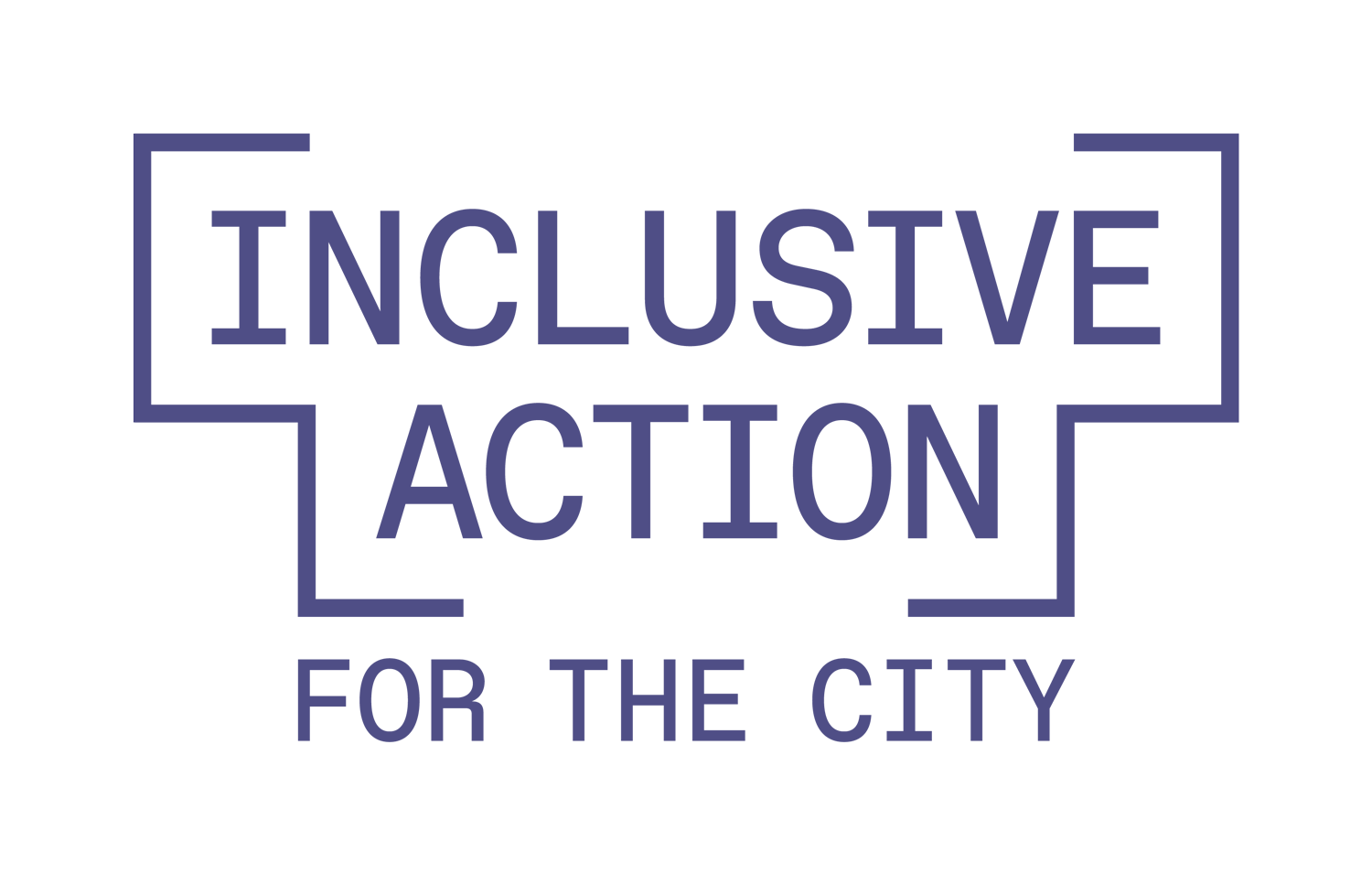
- Founded: 2008
- Type: Non-profit; CDFI
- Location: Los Angeles, California
- Services: Community ownership, Legal Assistance, Microfinance
- Fields: Community Development, Economic development
- Key people: Rudy Espinoza (Executive Director); Nicole Anand (Deputy Director)
- Website: https://www.inclusiveaction.org/

Inclusive Action for the City (IAC) is a non-profit, certified community development financial institution (CDFI) based in Los Angeles, California. It was originally founded as the Leadership for Urban Renewal Network (LURN) in 2008. Its mission is to support local economies by improving access to capital for small businesses and advancing policies through research and advocacy.

Since its designation as a CDFI in 2020, IAC has secured more than $1.5 million from the United States Department of the Treasury CDFI fund. In 2024, it was awarded $1 million in funding from Citi Foundation, and is now part of its Community Progress Makers cohort in Southern California.

== Initiatives ==
=== Support for street vendors ===
Through its advocacy work, IAC helped to pass California Senate Bill 946, which legalized street vending, as well as Senate Bill 972, which made it easier for food vendors to get permits.

The IAC has also supported street vendors in Los Angeles by extending microloans to them. In addition, in 2022, the organization was a plaintiff in a lawsuit against the city of Los Angeles on behalf of street vendors.

=== Community Owned Real Estate ===
The IAC advocates "mission-driven land acquisition" to preserve local communities and culture, and to combat displacement resulting from gentrification. To this end, in 2018, it launched a joint venture, the Community Owned Real Estate (CORE) program, with three other organizations, including Genesis LA, East LA Community Corporation, and Little Tokyo Service Center.

CORE acquired five commercial properties in Boyle Heights, East Los Angeles, and El Sereno, with the aim of providing affordable spaces to small businesses and non-profit organizations supporting the local community. By 2023, the buildings were leased by 21 small businesses and non-profits. The long-term goal is to move the properties toward community ownership.

A critical element of IAC and CORE's financial strategy was the use of $3 million in New Markets Tax Credits (NMTCs), which subsidized $5.6 million in debt. Another $1.4 million was secured from philanthropic grants and equity. The program has subsequently focused on raising additional funds to keep the properties affordable once the NMTCs expire.

== See also ==
- Affordable housing
- Community development financial institution (CDFI)
- Street vending in Los Angeles
