= Public Policy Institute of California =

Organization in San Francisco, United States

- Established: 1994
- President/CEO: Tani Cantil-Sakauye
- Budget: Support and Revenue: $15,134,000; Expenses: $16,519,000 (FYE June 2025)
- Address: 475 Sansome Street, Suite 1150; San Francisco, California 94111
- Website: www.ppic.org

The Public Policy Institute of California is an independent, non-profit research institution. Based in San Francisco, California, the institute was established in 1994 by Bill Hewlett, of Hewlett-Packard, Roger Heyns, and Arjay Miller, with a $70 million endowment from Hewlett.

Research by the institute focuses on population issues, the economy, governance and public finance. The PPIC also conducts polls of public opinion on issues related to California public policy. It disseminates its research to state, local, and federal officials, as well as non-profit and private sectors leaders, public media, and the general public. It has organized conferences to focus on significant policy issues, such as the effects of California ballot propositions.

The institute has a summer intern program for graduate students.
