= 2024 United States ballot measures =

- March 5 to November 5, 2024

Part of the 2024 United States elections

The following is a list of ballot measures, whether initiated by legislators or citizens, which were certified to appear on various states' ballots during the 2024 United States elections.

== List by State ==
=== Alabama ===
State	Origin	Status	Measure	Description (Result of a "yes" vote)	Date	% req.	Yes	No
Alabama	Legislature	Failed	Alabama Amendment 1, Exempt Local Bills from Budget Isolation Resolution Amendment	Exempts local laws or local constitutional amendments from the budget isolation resolution process.	Mar 5	>50%	341,515; 48.69%	359,850; 51.31%
Alabama	Legislature	Approved	Alabama Amendment 1, Allow Franklin County Board of Education to Manage, Sell, or Lease Land in the Franklin County School System Amendment	Transfers control of land to the Franklin County Board of Education.	Nov 5	>50%	1,159,794; 74.37%	399,640; 25.63%

=== Alaska ===
State	Origin	Status	Measure	Description (Result of a "yes" vote)	Date	% req.	Yes	No
Alaska	Citizens	Approved	Measure 1	Increases the minimum wage to $15/hr (currently $11.73/hr) by July 2027; provides 40–56 hours of paid sick leave a year depending on employer size; protects employees from being required to attend meetings on political and religious matters.	Nov 5	>50%	183,744; 57.98%	133,162; 42.02%
Alaska	Citizens	Failed	Measure 2	Repeal Alaska's electoral system of ranked-choice (instant-runoff) voting and nonpartisan blanket primaries and return the state to partisan primaries and plurality voting.	Nov 5	>50%	160,124; 49.89%	160,861; 50.11%

=== Arizona ===
State	Origin	Status	Measure	Description (Result of a "yes" vote)	Date	% req.	Yes	No
Arizona	Legislature	Failed	Proposition 133	Require partisan primary elections for partisan offices and prohibit primary elections where all candidates, regardless of political party affiliation, run in the same primary election, such as top-two, top-four, and top-five primaries	Nov 5	>50%	1,286,640; 42.18%	1,763,711; 57.82%
Arizona	Legislature	Failed	Proposition 134	Establishing a signature distribution requirement for citizen initiatives requiring signatures from 10% of votes cast for governor in each legislative district to qualify initiated state statutes for the ballot, and requiring signatures from 15% of votes cast for governor in each legislative district to qualify initiated constitutional amendments for the ballot.	Nov 5	>50%	1,279,574; 41.98%	1,768,613; 58.02%
Arizona	Legislature	Failed	Proposition 135	Allow the legislature to terminate a state of emergency or change the emergency powers granted to the governor during a state of emergency; provide that a state of emergency automatically ends 30 days after it is declared, unless the state legislature extends the governor's emergency powers; and exempt emergencies related to a state of war, flood, or fire from the 30-day automatic termination.	Nov 5	>50%	1,328,402; 43.56%	1,720,849; 56.44%
Arizona	Legislature	Failed	Proposition 136	Authorize a person to bring forth a lawsuit to stop a voter-proposed initiative from being placed on the ballot if that person sues at least one hundred days prior to the election and claims the proposed initiative would violate the United States Constitution or Arizona Constitution.	Nov 5	>50%	1,151,823; 38.10%	1,871,364; 61.90%
Arizona	Legislature	Failed	Proposition 137	End term limits for state supreme court justices and superior court judges; provide that justices can hold office during good behavior as determined by a judicial review commission; eliminate retention elections based on terms for the Arizona Supreme Court, court of appeals, and some superior courts, including those for Nov. 5, 2024; and require retention elections in the future for some issues, such as following a criminal conviction, filing for bankruptcy, or not meeting judicial performance standards as the performance review commission determines.	Nov 5	>50%	679,824; 22.33%	2,364,888; 77.67%
Arizona	Legislature	Failed	Proposition 138	Allow for tipped workers to be paid 25% less per hour than the minimum wage if any tips received by the employee were not less than the minimum wage plus $2 for all hours worked.	Nov 5	>50%	792,557; 25.24%	2,348,023; 74.76%
Arizona	Citizens	Approved	Proposition 139	Enshrines abortion until fetal viability or to protect health of the mother	Nov 5	>50%	2,000,287; 61.61%	1,246,202; 38.39%
Arizona	Citizens	Failed	Proposition 140	Require primaries in which candidates, regardless of partisan affiliation, appear on a single ballot and a certain number advance to the general election, and require general election candidates to receive a majority of votes	Nov 5	>50%	1,284,176; 41.32%	1,823,445; 58.68%
Arizona	Legislature	Approved	Proposition 311	Establish a $20 fee on every conviction for a criminal offense, which would go to pay a benefit of $250,000 to the spouse or children of a first responder who is killed in the line of duty.	Nov 5	>50%	2,016,450; 64.17%	1,126,070; 35.83%
Arizona	Legislature	Approved	Proposition 312	Allow for property owners to apply for a property tax refund if the city or locality in which the property is located does not enforce laws or ordinances regarding illegal camping, loitering, obstructing public thoroughfares, panhandling, public urination or defecation, public consumption of alcoholic beverages, and possession or use of illegal substances.	Nov 5	>50%	1,804,728; 58.62%	1,274,031; 41.38%
Arizona	Legislature	Approved	Proposition 313	Require that anyone convicted of child sex trafficking be sentenced to life in prison without the possibility of parole or release.	Nov 5	>50%	2,025,608; 64.54%	1,112,951; 35.46%
Arizona	Legislature	Approved	Proposition 314	Make it a state crime for noncitizens to enter the state at any location other than the port of entry; allow for state and local police to arrest noncitizens who cross the border unlawfully; allowing for state judges to order deportations; requiring the use of the E-Verify program in order to determine the immigration status of individuals before the enrollment in a financial aid or public welfare program; making it a Class 6 felony for individuals who submit false information or documents to an employer to evade detection of employment eligibility, or to apply for public benefits, and; make the sale of fentanyl a Class 2 felony if the person knowingly sells fentanyl and it results in the death of another person.	Nov 5	>50%	1,949,529; 62.59%	1,165,237; 37.41%
Arizona	Legislature	Failed	Proposition 315	Prohibit a proposed rule from becoming effective if that rule is estimated to increase regulatory costs by more than $500,000 within five years after implementation, until the legislature enacts legislation ratifying the proposed rule.	Nov 5	>50%	1,383,303; 46.69%	1,579,549; 53.31%

=== Arkansas ===
State	Origin	Status	Measure	Description (Result of a "yes" vote)	Date	% req.	Yes	No
Arkansas	Legislature	Approved	Issue 1	Allow proceeds from the state lottery to fund scholarships and grants for vocational-technical schools and technical institutes.	Aug 6	>50%	1,029,102; 89.19%	119,527; 10.41%
Arkansas	Citizens	Approved	Issue 2	Repeal the authorization for a casino license in Pope County and requiring countywide voter approval for any new casino licenses.	Aug 6	>50%	638,655; 55.81%	505,772; 44.19%

=== California ===
State	Origin	Status	Measure	Description (Result of a "yes" vote)	Date	% req.	Yes	No
California	Legislature	Approved	California Proposition 1, Behavioral Health Services Program and Bond Measure	Reforms the Mental Health Services Act and issues $6.38 billion in bonds for homeless individuals and veterans.	Mar 5	>50%	3,636,678; 50.18%	3,610,436; 49.82%
California	Bond Issue	Approved	Proposition 2	Issue $10 billion in bonds to fund construction and modernization of public education facilities.	Nov 5	>50%	8,820,842; 58.70%	6,207,390; 41.30%
California	Legislature	Approved	Proposition 3	Repeal Proposition 8 and the states Constitutional Amendment against same-sex marriage by declaring that a "right to marry is a fundamental right" in the California Constitution.	Nov 5	>50%	9,477,435; 62.62%	5,658,187; 37.38%
California	Bond Issue	Approved	Proposition 4	Issue $10 billion in bonds to fund state and local parks, environmental protection projects, water infrastructure projects, energy projects, and flood protection projects.	Nov 5	>50%	9,055,116; 59.80%	6,086,414; 40.20%
California	Legislature	Failed	Proposition 5	Measure to lower the vote threshold from two-thirds (66.67%) to 55% for local bond measures to fund housing projects and public infrastructure.	Nov 5	>50%	6,738,890; 44.99%	8,239,337; 55.01%
California	Legislature	Failed	Proposition 6	Eliminate the Constitutional provision permitting the use of involuntary servitude against incarcerated individuals.	Nov 5	>50%	6,895,604; 46.66%	7,882,137; 53.34%
California	Citizens	Failed	Proposition 32	Increase the state minimum wage to $18 per hour by 2026 for all employers and thereafter adjusting the rate annually by increases to the cost of living.	Nov 5	>50%	7,469,803; 49.29%	7,686,126; 50.71%
California	Citizens	Failed	Proposition 33	Repeals the Costa–Hawkins Rental Housing Act, allowing cities to once again establish their own rent controls on single-family dwellings, condominiums, and residential properties completed after February 1, 1995.	Nov 5	>50%	5,979,880; 39.98%	8,975,542; 60.02%
California	Citizens	Approved	Proposition 34	Requires health care providers that have spent over $100 million in any 10-year period on anything other than direct patient care, and operated multifamily housing with over 500 high-severity health and safety violations, to spend 98% of the revenues from federal discount prescription drug program on direct patient care.	Nov 5	>50%	7,378,686; 50.89%	7,121,317; 49.11%
California	Citizens	Approved	Proposition 35	Makes permanent the existing tax on managed health care insurance plans, currently set to expire in 2026. It would also require the revenues generated by the tax to only be used for specified Medi-Cal services, and prohibit the revenue from being used to replace other existing Medi-Cal funding.	Nov 5	>50%	10,124,174; 67.91%	4,783,434; 32.09%
California	Citizens	Approved	Proposition 36	Increase the penalties and sentences for certain drug and theft crimes from being only chargeable as misdemeanors. It would allow, among others, felony charges for possessing fentanyl and other certain drugs, and for thefts under $950, with two prior drug or theft convictions, respectively.	Nov 5	>50%	10,307,296; 68.42%	4,756,612; 31.58%

=== Colorado ===
State	Origin	Status	Measure	Description (Result of a "yes" vote)	Date	% req.	Yes	No
Colorado	Citizens	Approved	Amendment 79	Enshrines abortion in the Colorado Constitution and allows the use of public funds for abortion healthcare	Nov 5	55%	1,921,593; 61.97%	1,179,261; 38.03%
Colorado	Citizens	Failed	Amendment 80	Defines school choice and enshrines in the state's constitution that "each K-12 child has the right to school choice;", that “all children have the right to equal opportunity to access a quality education,” and that “parents have the right to direct the education of their children.	Nov 5	55%	1,507,236; 49.32%	1,548,679; 50.68%
Colorado	Legislature	Approved	Amendment G	Expand the property tax exemption for veterans with a disability to include veterans with individual unemployability status as determined by the United States Department of Veterans Affairs.	Nov 5	55%	2,212,022; 73.13%	812,638; 36.87%
Colorado	Legislature	Approved	Amendment H	Create a new board, called the Independent Judicial Discipline Adjudicative Board, and create rules for the judicial discipline process.	Nov 5	55%	2,150,820; 73.05%	793,642; 26.95%
Colorado	Legislature	Approved	Amendment I	Remove the right to bail in cases of first-degree murder when the proof is evident or the presumption is great.	Nov 5	55%	2,058,063; 68.34%	953,653; 31.66%
Colorado	Legislature	Approved	Amendment J	Repeal Amendment 43 and the state's Constitutional Amendment against same-sex marriage.	Nov 5	>50%	1,982,200; 64.33%	1,099,288; 35.37%
Colorado	Legislature	Failed	Amendment K	Change the signature deadline for initiative and referendum signature gathering, thereby shorting the collection period by one week, as well as moving the deadline for justices and judges to file declarations of intent to run for another term by one week, in order to allow one extra week for the secretary of state to certify ballot order and content and election officials' deadline to transmit ballots.	Nov 5	55%	1,293,879; 44.85%	1,591,312; 55.15%
Colorado	Citizens	Failed	Proposition 127	Prohibit the hunting of mountain lions, bobcats, and lynxes	Nov 5	>50%	1,382,048; 45.26%	1,671,710; 54.74%
Colorado	Citizens	Approved	Proposition 128	Requires any individual convicted of a violent felony offense to serve 85% of their sentence before being eligible for parole or any sentence reductions for good behavior.	Nov 5	>50%	1,869,231; 62.11%	1,140,284; 37.89%
Colorado	Citizens	Approved	Proposition 129	Create a new profession, the veterinary professional associate, that requires a master's degree and registration with the state board of veterinary medicine, to practice under supervision of a licensed veterinarian.	Nov 5	>50%	1,572,545; 52.76%	1,407,814; 47.24%
Colorado	Citizens	Approved	Proposition 130	Create the Peace Officer Training and Support Fund to provide funding for law enforcement training, retention, and hiring; training surrounding the use of force; and death benefits for surviving spouses and children of officers or first responders killed in the line of duty.	Nov 5	>50%	1,583,118; 52.79%	1,415,528; 47.21%
Colorado	Citizens	Failed	Proposition 131	Establish top-four primaries and ranked-choice voting for federal and state offices in Colorado	Nov 5	>50%	1,385,060; 46.47%	1,595,256; 53.53%
Colorado	Legislature	Approved	Proposition JJ	Allow the state to retain tax revenue collected above $29 million annually from the tax on sports betting proceeds authorized by voters in 2019.	Nov 5	>50%	2,340,370; 76.44%	721,237; 23.56%
Colorado	Legislature	Approved	Proposition KK	Levy a 6.5% excise tax on the manufacture and sale of firearms and ammunition to be imposed on firearms dealers, manufacturers, and ammunition vendors and appropriating the revenue to the Firearms and Ammunition Excise Tax Cash Fund to be used to fund crime victim services programs, mental and behavioral health programs for children and veterans, and school security and safety programs.	Nov 5	>50%	1,675,123; 54.37%	1,406,112; 45.63%

=== Connecticut ===
State	Origin	Status	Measure	Description (Result of a "yes" vote)	Date	% req.	Yes	No
Connecticut	Legislature	Approved	Connecticut No-Excuse Absentee Voting Amendment	Authorize the Connecticut State Legislature to provide by law for no-excuse absentee voting, thereby allowing any voter to request a mail-in ballot.	Nov 5	>50%	843,153; 57.99%	610,694; 42.01%

=== Florida ===
State	Origin	Status	Measure	Description (Result of a "yes" vote)	Date	% req.	Yes	No
Florida	Legislature	Failed	Amendment 1	Make school board elections partisan beginning in the November 2026 general election and for primary elections nominating party candidates for the 2026 election.	Nov 5	60%	5,492,993; 54.90%	4,512,372; 45.10%
Florida	Legislature	Approved	Amendment 2	Establish a constitutional right to hunt and fish in Florida.	Nov 5	60%	6,941,307; 67.34%	3,365,987; 32.66%
Florida	Citizens	Failed	Amendment 3	Legalize marijuana for adults 21 years old and older and allow for individuals to possess up to three ounces of marijuana	Nov 5	60%	5,950,589; 55.90%	4,693,524; 44.10%
Florida	Citizens	Failed	Amendment 4	Enshrines abortion until fetal viability or to protect health of the mother	Nov 5	60%	6,070,758; 57.17%	4,548,379; 42.83%
Florida	Legislature	Approved	Amendment 5	Apply an annual inflation adjustment to the amount of assessed value that is exempt from property taxation.	Nov 5	60%	6,687,238; 66.02%	3,441,658; 33.98%
Florida	Legislature	Failed	Amendment 6	Repeal the state constitutional provision that provides for public financing of campaigns for those running for elective statewide office who agree to campaign spending limits.	Nov 5	60%	5,032,882; 50.39%	4,955,737; 49.61%

=== Georgia ===
State	Origin	Status	Measure	Description (Result of a "yes" vote)	Date	% req.	Yes	No
Georgia	Legislature	Approved	Amendment 1	Provide for a local option homestead property tax exemption and allowing a county, municipality, or school system to opt out of the exemption.	Nov 5	>50%	3,094,322; 62.92%	1,823,529; 37.08%
Georgia	Legislature	Approved	Amendment 2	Create the Georgia Tax Court to have concurrent jurisdiction with superior courts.	Nov 5	>50%	2,525,406; 51.89%	2,341,612; 48.11%
Georgia	Legislature	Approved	Referendum A	Increase the personal property tax exemption from $7,500 to $20,000.	Nov 5	>50%	3,223,888; 64.48%	1,775,768; 35.52%

=== Hawaii ===
State	Origin	Status	Measure	Description (Result of a "yes" vote)	Date	% req.	Yes	No
Hawaii	Legislature	Approved	Amendment 1	Repeal Amendment 2 and the Legislature's ability reserve marriage to opposite-sex couples.	Nov 5	>50%	268,038; 55.94%	211,142; 44.06%
Hawaii	Legislature	Approved	Amendment 2	Change the process for appointing and confirming district court judges to be the same as that used for supreme court justices and other higher court judges.	Nov 5	>50%	316,468; 70.61%	131,729; 29.39%

=== Idaho ===
State	Origin	Status	Measure	Description (Result of a "yes" vote)	Date	% req.	Yes	No
Idaho	Legislature	Passed	Citizenship Requirement for Voting	Prohibits state and local governments from allowing non-citizens to vote.	Nov 5	>50%	572,865; 64.93%	309,456; 35.07%
Idaho	Citizens	Failed	Proposition 1	Implements a top-four nonpartisan blanket primary; with ranked-choice voting for the general election for state, county, and federal offices.	Nov 5	>50%	269,959; 30.38%	618,751; 69.62%

=== Illinois ===
State	Origin	Status	Measure	Description (Result of a "yes" vote)	Date	% req.	Yes	No
Illinois	Advisory question	Approved	Illinois Assisted Reproductive Healthcare Advisory Question	Advise state officials to provide for medically assisted reproductive treatments, including in vitro fertilization, to be covered by any health insurance plan in Illinois that provides full coverage to pregnancy benefits.	Nov 5	>50%	3,914,126; 72.64%	1,474,158; 27.36%
Illinois	Advisory Question	Approved	Illinois Income Tax Advisory Question	Advise state officials to amend the Illinois Constitution to create an additional 3% tax on income greater than $1 million for the purpose of dedicating funds to property tax relief.	Nov 5	>50%	3,288,462; 60.79%	2,121,507; 39.21%
Illinois	Advisory Question	Approved	Illinois Penalties for Candidate Interference with Election Worker's Duties Advisory Question	Advise state officials to establish civil penalties if a candidate interferes or attempts to interfere with an election worker's official duties.	Nov 5	>50%	4,813,971; 88.99%	595,677; 11.01%

=== Iowa ===
State	Origin	Status	Measure	Description (Result of a "yes" vote)	Date	% req.	Yes	No
Iowa	Legislature	Approved	Amendment 1	Prohibits state and local governments from allowing non-citizens to vote, and would allow some 17-year-olds to vote in primaries, provided they turn 18 by the next general election.	Nov 5	>50%	1,150,332; 77.13%	341,034; 22.87%
Iowa	Legislature	Approved	Amendment 2	Provide so that, if the governor dies, resigns, or is removed from office, the lieutenant governor would assume the office of governor for the remainder of the term, thereby creating a vacancy in the office of lieutenant governor and allowing the new governor to appoint a new lieutenant governor.	Nov 5	>50%	1,190,003; 81.05%	278,282; 18.95%

=== Kentucky ===
State	Origin	Status	Measure	Description (Result of a "yes" vote)	Date	% req.	Yes	No
Kentucky	Legislature	Passed	Amendment 1	Prohibits state and local governments from allowing non-citizens to vote.	Nov 5	>50%	1,208,898; 62.43%	727,515; 37.57%
Kentucky	Legislature	Failed	Amendment 2	Enable the General Assembly to provide state funding to students outside of public schools.	Nov 5	>50%	706,942; 35.24%	1,298,967; 64.76%

=== Louisiana ===
State	Origin	Status	Measure	Description (Result of a "yes" vote)	Date	% req.	Yes	No
Louisiana	Legislature	Approved	Louisiana Outer Continental Shelf Revenues for Coastal Protection and Restoration Fund Amendment	Require federal revenue received from alternative and renewable energy production in the Outer Continental Shelf (OCS) to be deposited in the Coastal Protection and Restoration Fund.	Nov 5	>50%	1,367,876; 73.10%	503,275; 26.90%
Louisiana	Legislature	Approved	Louisiana Amendment 1	Increase the membership of the judiciary commission by five members, add malfeasance while in office to the list of specific actions that the state supreme court can pursue disciplinary action against a judge, and providing the judiciary commission the responsibility for investigating and recommending disciplinary actions.	Dec 7	>50%	176,864; 53.25%	155,252; 46.75%
Louisiana	Legislature	Approved	Louisiana Amendment 2	Prohibit the consideration of a conference committee report or senate amendments on an appropriations bill until 48 hours after the bill and a summary of the proposed changes is distributed to all legislators.	Dec 7	>50%	219,103; 65.99%	112,938; 34.01%
Louisiana	Legislature	Approved	Louisiana Amendment 3	Allow the state legislature to extend its regular session by two-day increments, up to a maximum of six days, in order to pass a bill appropriating money.	Dec 7	>50%	191,729; 57.72%	140,452; 42.28%
Louisiana	Legislature	Approved	Louisiana Amendment 4	Authorize the state legislature to provide for property tax sales in state law, provide that tax payment postponements can only be granted during emergencies declared by the governor under the Louisiana Homeland Security and Emergency Assistance and Disaster Act, and allowing the state legislature to give tax collectors the authority to waive penalties for good cause.	Dec 7	>50%	180,856; 54.59%	150,423; 45.51%

=== Maine ===
State	Origin	Status	Measure	Description (Result of a "yes" vote)	Date	% req.	Yes	No
Maine	Citizens	Approved	Question 1	Limit the amount of campaign contributions to $5,000 from individuals and entities to political action committees that make independent expenditures.	Nov 5	>50%	600,191; 74.91%	201,034; 25.09%
Maine	Bond Issue	Approved	Question 2	Authorize $25 million in general obligation bonds to the Maine Technology Institute for research, development, and commercialization of Maine-based public and private institutions in support of technological innovation.	Nov 5	>50%	433,394; 54.28%	365,100; 45.72%
Maine	Bond Issue	Approved	Question 3	Authorize $10 million in general obligation bonds for the restoration of local community buildings.	Nov 5	>50%	410,979; 51.23%	391,176; 48.77%
Maine	Bond Issue	Approved	Question 4	Authorize $30 million in general obligation bonds for the development and maintenance of outdoor trails.	Nov 5	>50%	440,560; 55.40%	354,626; 44.60%
Maine	Legislature	Failed	Question 5	Replace the existing state flag with a flag consisting of a pine tree and the North Star on a buff (light tan) background, often called the Pine Tree Flag.	Nov 5	>50%	358,912; 44.29%	451,366; 55.71%

=== Maryland ===
State	Origin	Status	Measure	Description (Result of a "yes" vote)	Date	% req.	Yes	No
Maryland	Legislature	Approved	Question 1	Enshrines abortion in the Maryland Constitution	Nov 5	>50%	2,199,319; 76.06%	692,219; 23.94%

=== Massachusetts ===
State	Origin	Status	Measure	Description (Result of a "yes" vote)	Date	% req.	Yes	No
Massachusetts	Citizens	Approved	Question 1	Explicitly authorize the state auditor to audit the accounts, programs, activities, and functions of all departments, offices, commissions, institutions, and activities of the state legislature and any authorities or districts created by the state legislature.	Nov 5	>50%	2,326,932; 71.57%	924,294; 28.43%
Massachusetts	Citizens	Approved	Question 2	Repeal the requirement that students must achieve a certain competency level on the Massachusetts Comprehensive Assessment System (MCAS) exam to graduate high school.	Nov 5	>50%	2,004,216; 59.07%	1,388,560; 40.93%
Massachusetts	Citizens	Approved	Question 3	Provide for unionizing and collective bargaining for transportation network drivers, require the state to oversee the negotiations between the parties and approve the negotiated recommendations on wages, benefits, and terms and conditions of work, and require collective bargaining agreements to be approved by at least a majority of riders who have completed at least 100 trips during the previous quarter.	Nov 5	>50%	1,771,770; 54.08%	1,504,681; 45.92%
Massachusetts	Citizens	Failed	Question 4	Allow persons 21 years of age or older to grow, possess, and use natural psychedelic substances, as well as establish a commission to regulate the licensing of psychedelic substances and services.	Nov 5	>50%	1,444,812; 43.16%	1,902,207; 56.84%
Massachusetts	Citizens	Failed	Question 5	Gradually increase the wage of tipped employees until it meets the state minimum wage in 2029 and continues to permit tipping in addition to the minimum wage.	Nov 5	>50%	1,200,980; 35.87%	2,147,245; 64.13%

=== Minnesota ===
State	Origin	Status	Measure	Description (Result of a "yes" vote)	Date	% req.	Yes	No
Minnesota	Legislature	Approved	Minnesota Amendment 1	Extend the dedication of revenue from the state-operated lottery to the Environment and Natural Resources Fund through December 31, 2050, increase the amount of money that can be spent from the fund each year from 5.5% to 7.0% of the fund's market value, and create a grant program to provide funding for projects related to addressing environmental issues in affected communities, environmental education, and natural resource conservation.	Nov 5	>50%	2,526,205; 82.64%	530,504; 17.36%

=== Missouri ===
State	Origin	Status	Measure	Description (Result of a "yes" vote)	Date	% req.	Yes	No
Missouri	Legislature	Failed	Missouri Amendment 1, Property Tax Exemption for Childcare Establishments Measure	Exempts childcare facilities from property taxes.	Aug 6	>50%	491,161; 45.28%	593,465; 54.72%
Missouri	Legislature	Approved	Amendment 4	Allows the legislature to increase minimum funding for a police force established by a state board of police commissioners.	Aug 6	>50%	549,919; 51.13%	525,657; 48.87%
Missouri	Citizens	Approved	Amendment 2	Legalize and regulating sports wagering in Missouri.	Nov 5	>50%	1,478,652; 50.05%	1,475,691; 49.95%
Missouri	Citizens	Approved	Amendment 3	Enshrines abortion until fetal viability	Nov 5	>50%	1,538,659; 51.60%	1,443,022; 48.40%
Missouri	Citizens	Failed	Amendment 5	Allow the Missouri Gaming Commission to issue one additional gambling boat license to operate on the portion of the Osage River from the Missouri River to the Bagnell Dam.	Nov 5	>50%	1,380,949; 47.54%	1,523,889; 52.46%
Missouri	Legislature	Failed	Amendment 6	Amend the Missouri Constitution to define the administration of justice to include the levying of costs and fees to support the salaries and benefits of sheriffs, former sheriffs, prosecuting attorneys, former prosecuting attorneys, circuit attorneys, and former circuit attorneys.	Nov 5	>50%	1,112,081; 39.39%	1,711,527; 60.61%
Missouri	Legislature	Approved	Amendment 7	Prohibits state and local governments from allowing non-citizens to vote, and ban ranked-choice voting in the state.	Nov 5	>50%	1,966,852; 68.44%	906,851; 31.56%
Missouri	Legislature	Approved	Proposition A	Establish a $13.75 per hour minimum wage by 2025, which would be increased by $1.25 per hour each year until 2026, when the minimum wage is $15 per hour, and also requiring employers to provide one hour of paid sick leave for every 30 hours worked.	Nov 5	>50%	1,693,064; 57.57%	1,247,658; 42.43%

=== Montana ===
State	Origin	Status	Measure	Description (Result of a "yes" vote)	Date	% req.	Yes	No
Montana	Citizens	Failed	CI-126	Establish top-four primaries for federal and state offices in Montana	Nov 5	>50%	287,837; 48.91%	300,664; 51.09%
Montana	Citizens	Failed	CI-127	Require an electoral system in which candidates for certain offices must win a majority of the vote, rather than a plurality, to win the election	Nov 5	>50%	228,908; 39.62%	348,805; 60.38%
Montana	Citizens	Approved	CI-128	Enshrines abortion until fetal viability or to protect health of the mother	Nov 5	>50%	345,070; 57.76%	252,300; 42.24%

=== Nebraska ===
State	Origin	Status	Measure	Description (Result of a "yes" vote)	Date	% req.	Yes	No
Nebraska	Citizens	Approved	Initiative 434	Prohibits abortion after the first trimester	Nov 5	>50% (Note: In order for either measure to pass, one amendment must receive at least 50% of the vote, 35% from all registered voters, and a greater vote total than the other amendment)	509,288; 54.94%	417,624; 45.06%
Nebraska	Citizens	Approved	Initiative 436	Require Nebraska businesses to offer earned paid sick leave for employees—up to seven days for businesses of at least 20 employees and five days for fewer than 20 employees.	Nov 5	>50%	662,348; 74.56%	225,974; 25.44%
Nebraska	Citizens	Approved	Initiative 437	Establish the Nebraska Medical Cannabis Commission to regulate the state's medical marijuana program.	Nov 5	>50%	637,126; 71.05%	259,643; 28.95%
Nebraska	Citizens	Approved	Initiative 438	Legalize the medical use of marijuana in the state	Nov 5	>50%	600,481; 67.29%	291,867; 32.71%
Nebraska	Citizens	Failed	Initiative 439	Enshrines abortion until fetal viability	Nov 5	>50%	455,184; 49.01%	473,652; 50.99%
Nebraska	Citizens	Failed	Referendum 435	Uphold Legislative Bill 1402, which authorizes the state treasurer to administer an education scholarship program with a $10 million budget beginning in fiscal year 2024-2025 for eligible students to cover all or part of the cost of attending any nongovernmental, privately operated elementary or secondary school in the state that fulfills all accreditation requirements.	Nov 5	>50%	382,921; 42.97%	508,140; 57.03%

=== Nevada ===
State	Origin	Status	Measure	Description (Result of a "yes" vote)	Date	% req.	Yes	No
Nevada	Legislature	Failed	Question 1	Remove the constitutional status of the Board of Regents—which governs, controls, and manages the state universities in Nevada—thereby allowing the state legislature to review and change the governing organization of state universities.	Nov 5	>50%	615,415; 45.44%	738,901; 54.56%
Nevada	Legislature	Approved	Question 2	Revise language in the state constitution related to public entities that benefit individuals with mental illness, blindness, or deafness.	Nov 5	>50%	897,821; 65.97%	463,218; 34.03%
Nevada	Citizens	Failed	Question 3	Establish top-five primaries and ranked-choice voting for federal and state offices in Nevada	Nov 5	>50%	664,011; 47.04%	747,719; 52.96%
Nevada	Legislature	Approved	Question 4	Remove Language in the Nevada State Constitution permitting the use of slavery and involuntary servitude as criminal punishments	Nov 5	>50%	835,627; 60.60%	543,236; 39.40%
Nevada	Legislature	Approved	Question 5	Amend the Sales and Use Tax of 1955 to provide a sales tax exemption for child and adult diapers.	Nov 5	>50%	942,828; 68.50%	433,583; 31.50%
Nevada	Citizens	Approved	Question 6	Enshrines abortion until fetal viability or to protect health of the mother	Nov 5	>50%	905,170; 64.36%	501,232; 35.64%
Nevada	Citizens	Approved	Question 7	Amend the constitution to require that Nevada residents present a form of photo identification to verify their identity while voting in person, or to verify their identity using the last four digits of their driver's license or social security number when voting by mail.	Nov 5	>50%	1,031,153; 73.23%	376,873; 26.77%

=== New Hampshire ===
State	Origin	Status	Measure	Description (Result of a "yes" vote)	Date	% req.	Yes	No
New Hampshire	Legislature	Failed	New Hampshire Increase Mandatory Retirement Age for Judges Amendment	Increase the mandatory judicial retirement age from 70 to 75.	Nov 5	>66.67%	452,307; 65.60%	237,221; 34.30%

=== New Mexico ===
State	Origin	Status	Measure	Description (Result of a "yes" vote)	Date	% req.	Yes	No
New Mexico	Bond Issue	Approved	Bond Question 1	Authorize the state to issue $30,758,100 in bonds to fund senior citizens' facilities.	Nov 5	>50%	572,049; 70.21%	242,732; 29.79%
New Mexico	Bond Issue	Approved	Bond Question 2	Authorize the state to issue $19,305,000 in bonds to fund public libraries.	Nov 5	>50%	545,321; 67.29%	265,087; 32.71%
New Mexico	Bond Issue	Approved	Bond Question 3	Authorize the state to issue $230.26 million in bonds to fund capital improvements and acquisitions for public higher education institutions, special public schools, and tribal schools.	Nov 5	>50%	530,807; 65.70%	277,070; 34.30%
New Mexico	Bond Issue	Approved	Bond Question 4	Authorize the state to issue $10,297,100 in bonds to modernize public safety radio communications systems.	Nov 5	>50%	498,733; 63.01%	292,783; 36.99%
New Mexico	Legislature	Approved	Amendment 1	Amend the state constitution to extend the disabled veteran property tax exemption to all disabled veterans (or their widows or widowers) in proportion to their federal disability rating.	Nov 5	>50%	701,047; 82.78%	145,855; 17.22%
New Mexico	Legislature	Approved	Amendment 2	Amend the state constitution to increase the property tax exemption for veterans from $4,000 to $10,000 and adjust it annually for inflation.	Nov 5	>50%	611,027; 71.77%	240,349; 28.23%
New Mexico	Legislature	Approved	Amendment 3	Authorize a designee of the dean of the University of New Mexico Law School to serve as chair of the judicial nomination commission and requiring the designee to be an associate dean, a faculty member, a retired faculty member, or a former dean of the law school.	Nov 5	>50%	412,465; 51.41%	389,871; 48.59%
New Mexico	Legislature	Approved	Amendment 4	Amend the state constitution to authorize the board of county commissioners to set salaries for county officers and clarify that fees collected by the county are to be deposited into the county treasury.	Nov 5	>50%	520,128; 65.67%	271,961; 34.33%

=== New York ===
State	Origin	Status	Measure	Description (Result of a "yes" vote)	Date	% req.	Yes	No
New York	Legislature	Approved	Proposal 1	Prohibit a person's rights from being denied based on the person's reproductive choices, among others	Nov 5	>50%	4,757,097; 62.47%	2,857,663; 37.53%

=== North Carolina ===
State	Origin	Status	Measure	Description (Result of a "yes" vote)	Date	% req.	Yes	No
North Carolina	Legislature	Approved	Citizenship Requirement for Voting Amendment	Prohibit the state and local governments from allowing noncitizens to vote	Nov 5	>50%	4,184,680; 77.59%	1,208,865; 22.41%

=== North Dakota ===
State	Origin	Status	Measure	Description (Result of a "yes" vote)	Date	% req.	Yes	No
North Dakota	Citizens	Approved	North Dakota Initiated Measure 1, Congressional Age Limits Initiative	Creates an age limit of 81 for congressional officeholders.	Jun 11	>50%	68,468; 60.84%	44,076; 39.16%
North Dakota	Legislature	Approved	Measure 1	Amend language used in the state constitution to describe certain state institutions such as changing "insane" to "individuals with mental illness", "feebleminded" to "individuals with developmental disabilities", and "deaf and dumb" to "deaf and hard of hearing."	Nov 5	>50%	301,944; 84.48%	55,464; 15.52%
North Dakota	Legislature	Failed	Measure 2	Establish a single-subject rule for initiatives (both statutory and constitutional), as determined by the secretary of state, increase the signature requirement for constitutional amendment initiatives from 4% of the resident population to 5% of the resident population of the state, and require proposed constitutional initiatives that have qualified for the ballot to be placed on the next primary election ballot, and, if approved, be placed on the next general election ballot, where it must be approved again to become effective.	Nov 5	>50%	150,362; 43.59%	194,570; 56.41%
North Dakota	Legislature	Approved	Measure 3	Decrease the amount of money that can be expended from the state legacy fund, a fund that receives 30% of tax revenue from oil and gas production, from 15% to 5% of the principal of the fund over a period of two years, and provides for a distribution to be made from the state legacy fund to a legacy earnings fund rather than have the accrued earnings be sent to the general fund.	Nov 5	>50%	174,994; 52.01%	161,496; 47.99%
North Dakota	Citizens	Failed	Measure 4	Prohibit the state and local governments from levying taxes on the assessed value of any real or personal property except for those designed to pay for bonded indebtedness.	Nov 5	>50%	130,038; 36.54%	225,889; 63.46%
North Dakota	Citizens	Failed	Measure 5	Legalize recreational marijuana, allowing individuals to possess up to 1 oz of marijuana, 4g of concentrate, 300mg of edibles; and allowing for individuals to grow three plants with a limit of six plants per household.	Nov 5	>50%	172,174; 47.47%	190,548; 52.53%

=== Ohio ===
State	Origin	Status	Measure	Description (Result of a "yes" vote)	Date	% req.	Yes	No
Ohio	Citizens	Failed	Issue 1	Establish the Ohio Citizens Redistricting Commission (CRC), a 15-member non-politician commission responsible for adopting state legislative and congressional redistricting plans.	Nov 5	>50%	2,531,900; 46.29%	2,937,489; 53.71%

=== Oklahoma ===
State	Origin	Status	Measure	Description (Result of a "yes" vote)	Date	% req.	Yes	No
Oklahoma	Legislature	Failed	Question 833	Allows municipalities to create infrastructure districts with the ability to issue bonds.	Nov 5	>50%	559,982; 38.89%	898,526; 61.61%
Oklahoma	Legislature	Approved	Question 834	Prohibits the state and local governments from allowing noncitizens to vote.	Nov 5	>50%	1,207,520; 80.73%	288,267; 19.27%

=== Oregon ===
State	Origin	Status	Measure	Description (Result of a "yes" vote)	Date	% req.	Yes	No
Oregon	Legislature	Approved	Measure 115	Allow the Oregon State Legislature to impeach and remove elected state executives, including the governor, secretary of state, attorney general, treasurer, and commissioner of labor and industries.	Nov 5	>50%	1,340,837; 64.20%	747,543; 35.80%
Oregon	Legislature	Failed	Measure 116	Establish the Independent Public Service Compensation Commission to determine certain public officials' salaries.	Nov 5	>50%	981,715; 47.54%	1,083,451; 52.46%
Oregon	Legislature	Failed	Measure 117	Establish ranked-choice voting for federal and state offices in Oregon	Nov 5	>50%	893,668; 42.30%	1,219,013; 57.70%
Oregon	Citizens	Failed	Measure 118	Increase the corporate minimum tax on sales exceeding $25 million by 3%, removing the minimum tax cap, and distributing increased revenue to Oregon residents who spend more than 200 days in the state.	Nov 5	>50%	477,516; 22.53%	1,641,682; 77.47%
Oregon	Citizens	Approved	Measure 119	Require cannabis businesses to submit to the Oregon Liquor and Cannabis Commission a signed labor peace agreement requiring the business to remain neutral when labor organizations communicate with employees about collective bargaining rights with its licensure or renewal application.	Nov 5	>50%	1,166,425; 56.74%	889,265; 43.26%

=== Rhode Island ===
State	Origin	Status	Measure	Description (Result of a "yes" vote)	Date	% req.	Yes	No
Rhode Island	Legislature	Failed	Question 1	Hold a state constitutional convention	Nov 5	>50%	173,459; 37.60%	287,906; 62.40%
Rhode Island	Bond Issue	Approved	Question 2	Issue $160.5 million in bonds for improvements to higher education facilities, with $87.5 million going to the construction of a University of Rhode Island Biomedical Sciences building, and $73 million going to renovations and improvements to the Rhode Island College Institute of Cybersecurity & Emerging Technologies.	Nov 5	>50%	281,672; 59.82%	189,173; 40.18%
Rhode Island	Bond Issue	Approved	Question 3	Issue $120 million in bonds to increase the availability of housing in the state.	Nov 5	>50%	308,949; 65.81%	160,536; 34.19%
Rhode Island	Bond Issue	Approved	Question 4	Issue $53 million in bonds for environmental-related infrastructure, local recreation projects, and for preservation of land.	Nov 5	>50%	315,973; 67.45%	152,478; 32.55%
Rhode Island	Bond Issue	Approved	Question 4	Issue $10 million in bonds for funding for 1:1 matching grants to continue the Cultural Arts and Economy Grant program administered by the Rhode Island state council on the arts, and for improvements and renovations to the Tomaquag Museum, the Newport Contemporary Ballet, and the Trinity Repertory Company.	Nov 5	>50%	263,551; 56.40%	203,769; 43.60%

=== South Carolina ===
State	Origin	Status	Measure	Description (Result of a "yes" vote)	Date	% req.	Yes	No
South Carolina	Legislature	Approved	Amendment 1	Prohibits the state and local governments from allowing noncitizens to vote.	Nov 5	>50%	1,982,956; 85.94%	324,432; 14.06%

=== South Dakota ===
State	Origin	Status	Measure	Description (Result of a "yes" vote)	Date	% req.	Yes	No
South Dakota	Legislature	Failed	Amendment E	Amend the text of the South Dakota Constitution to change male pronouns to gender-neutral terms or titles	Nov 5	>50%	180,365; 42.62%	242,866; 57.38%
South Dakota	Legislature	Approved	Amendment F	Amend the South Dakota Constitution to provide that the state may impose a work requirement on eligible individuals who are not diagnosed as being mentally or physically disabled in order to receive Medicaid under the Medicaid expansion that took effect on July 1, 2023.	Nov 5	>50%	236,410; 56.12%	184,829; 43.88%
South Dakota	Citizens	Failed	Amendment G	Enshrines abortion during the first trimester, with limits on regulation during the second trimester	Nov 5	>50%	176,809; 41.41%	250,136; 58.59%
South Dakota	Citizens	Failed	Amendment H	Establish top-two primaries for federal, state, and certain local offices in South Dakota	Nov 5	>50%	141,570; 34.39%	270,048; 65.51%
South Dakota	Citizens	Failed	Measure 28	Prohibit state sales taxes on anything sold for human consumption, not including alcoholic beverages or prepared food.	Nov 5	>50%	129,261; 30.76%	290,969; 69.24%
South Dakota	Citizens	Failed	Measure 29	Legalize the recreational use, possession, and distribution of marijuana.	Nov 5	>50%	189,916; 44.46%	237,228; 55.54%
South Dakota	Veto Referendum	Failed	South Dakota Referred Law 21	Uphold Senate Bill 201, which provides statutory requirements for regulating carbon dioxide pipelines and other transmission facilities, and allows counties to impose a surcharge on certain pipeline companies.	Nov 5	>50%	189,916; 44.46%	237,228; 55.54%

=== Utah ===
State	Origin	Status	Measure	Description (Result of a "yes" vote)	Date	% req.	Yes	No
Utah	Legislature	Approved	Amendment B	Increase the limit on annual distributions from the State School Fund for public education from 4% to 5% of the fund.	Nov 5	>50%	1,004,901; 71.38%	402,865; 28.62%
Utah	Legislature	Approved	Amendment C	Establish in the state constitution that every county shall elect a sheriff to serve for four-year terms.	Nov 5	>50%	1,165,753; 82.68%	244,196; 17.32%

=== Virginia ===
State	Origin	Status	Measure	Description (Result of a "yes" vote)	Date	% req.	Yes	No
Virginia	Legislature	Approved	Virginia Property Tax Exemption for Veterans and Surviving Spouses Amendment	Amend language in the Virginia Constitution regarding property tax exemptions for veterans and surviving spouses to say died in the line of duty rather than killed in action.	Nov 5	>50%	4,035,483; 93.03%	302,203; 6.97%

=== Washington ===
State	Origin	Status	Measure	Description (Result of a "yes" vote)	Date	% req.	Yes	No
Washington	Citizens	Approved	Initiative 2066	Prohibit state and local governments from restricting access to natural gas, prohibit the state building code council from discouraging or penalizing the use of natural gas in any building, require gas companies and utility companies, or any cities or towns that provide natural gas, to provide natural gas to any person or corporation even if other energy services or energy sources may be available and prohibit the Washington Utilities and Transportation Commission from approving any multiyear rate plan requiring or incentivizing a natural gas company or utility company to terminate natural gas service or implementing requirements that would make access to natural gas service cost-prohibitive.	Nov 5	>50%	1,941,474; 51.71%	1,813,169; 48.29%
Washington	Citizens	Failed	Initiative 2109	Repeal the capital gains excise tax imposed on long-term capital assets by individuals with capital gains over $250,000.	Nov 5	>50%	1,364,510; 35.89%	2,437,419; 64.11%
Washington	Citizens	Failed	Initiative 2117	Prohibit any state agencies from implementing a cap and trade or cap and tax program and repeal the 2021 Washington Climate Commitment Act (CCA), a state law that provided for a cap and invest program designed to reduce greenhouse gas (GHG) emissions by 95% by 2050.	Nov 5	>50%	1,437,103; 38.05%	2,340,077; 61.95%
Washington	Citizens	Failed	Initiative 2124	Allow employees and self-employed individuals to opt out of paying the payroll tax and receiving benefits under WA Cares, the state's long-term services and supports trust health care program.	Nov 5	>50%	1,668,435; 44.54%	2,077,216; 55.46%

=== West Virginia ===
State	Origin	Status	Measure	Description (Result of a "yes" vote)	Date	% req.	Yes	No
West Virginia	Legislature	Approved	Amendment 1	Amend the West Virginia Constitution to prohibit people from participating in "the practice of medically assisted suicide, euthanasia, or mercy killing of a person."	Nov 5	>50%	340,403; 50.44%	334,521; 49.56%

=== Wisconsin ===
State	Origin	Status	Measure	Description (Result of a "yes" vote)	Date	% req.	Yes	No
Wisconsin	Legislature	Approved	Wisconsin Question 1, Ban on Private and Non-Governmental Funding of Election Administration Amendment	Prohibits governments in the state from applying or accepting non-governmental funds or equipment for election administration.	Apr 2	>50%	638,555; 54.43%	534,612; 45.57%
Wisconsin	Legislature	Approved	Wisconsin Question 2, Only Designated Election Officials to Conduct Elections Amendment	Mandates that only election officials may administer elections.	Apr 2	>50%	685,806; 58.63%	483,900; 41.37%
Wisconsin	Legislature	Failed	Question 1	Prohibits the legislature from delegating its power to appropriate money.	Aug 13	>50%	521,538; 42.55%	704,260; 57.45%
Wisconsin	Legislature	Failed	Question 2	Requires legislative approval before the governor can expend federal money appropriated to the state.	Aug 13	>50%	521,639; 42.47%	706,637; 57.53%
Wisconsin	Legislature	Approved	Citizenship Voting Requirement Amendment	Prohibit the state and local governments from allowing noncitizens to vote	Nov 5	>50%	2,272,446; 70.51%	950,445; 29.49%

=== Wyoming ===
State	Origin	Status	Measure	Description (Result of a "yes" vote)	Date	% req.	Yes	No
Wyoming	Legislature	Approved	Amendment A	Separates residential property into its own class for purposes of property tax assessment.	Nov 5	>50% (Note: Out of 271,123 ballots cast)	146,336; 59.31%	100,392; 40.69%

== Other jurisdictions ==
=== District of Columbia ===
State	Origin	Status	Measure	Description (Result of a "yes" vote)	Date	% req.	Yes	No
District of Columbia	Citizens	Approved	Initiative 83	Allows independent voters to participate in partisan primaries and implements ranked-choice voting.	Nov 5	>50%	212,332; 72.89%	78,961; 27.11%

=== Puerto Rico ===
State	Origin	Status	Measure	Description	Date	% req.	Statehood	Free association	Independence
Puerto Rico	Citizens	Approved	Puerto Rico Statehood, Independence, or Free Association Referendum	A vote for statehood supported the admission of Puerto Rico as the 51st state of the United States of America. A vote for independence supported becoming an independent sovereign nation. A vote for sovereignty in free association with the United States supported making Puerto Rico a sovereign nation outside the Territory Clause of the U.S. Constitution and entering into Articles of Free Association with the United States and delegating certain powers and responsibilities to the United States.	Nov 5	>50%	620,782; 58.61%	313,259; 29.57%	125,171; 11.82%

== By topic ==
=== Abortion ===
As of September 11, 2024, 10 states have certified a referendum on abortion for the 2024 United States elections. This is the most for a single election cycle on record.

State	Current policy	Origin	Status	Measure	Description (Result of a "yes" vote)	Date	% req.	Yes	No
Arizona	15th week	Citizens	Approved	Proposition 139	Enshrines abortion until fetal viability or to protect health of the mother	Nov 5	>50%	2,000,287; 61.61%	1,246,202; 38.39%
Colorado	Any stage	Citizens	Approved	Amendment 79	Enshrines abortion in the Colorado Constitution and allows the use of public funds for abortion healthcare	Nov 5	55%	1,921,593; 61.97%	1,179,261; 38.03%
Florida	6th week	Citizens	Failed	Amendment 4	Enshrines abortion until fetal viability or to protect health of the mother	Nov 5	60%	6,070,758; 57.17%	4,548,379; 42.83%
Maryland	Fetal viability	Legislature	Approved	Question 1	Enshrines abortion in the Maryland Constitution	Nov 5	>50%	2,199,319; 76.06%	692,219; 23.94%
Missouri	Banned	Citizens	Approved	Amendment 3	Enshrines abortion until fetal viability	Nov 5	>50%	1,538,659; 51.60%	1,443,022; 48.40%
Montana	Fetal viability	Citizens	Approved	CI-128	Enshrines abortion until fetal viability or to protect health of the mother	Nov 5	>50%	345,070; 57.76%	252,300; 42.24%
Nebraska	12th week	Citizens	Approved	Initiative 434	Prohibits abortion after the first trimester	Nov 5	>50%	509,288; 54.94%	417,624; 45.06%
Nebraska	12th week	Citizens	Failed	Initiative 439	Enshrines abortion until fetal viability	Nov 5	>50%	455,184; 49.01%	473,652; 50.99%
Nevada	24th week	Citizens	Approved	Question 6	Enshrines abortion until fetal viability or to protect health of the mother	Nov 5	>50%	905,170; 64.36%	501,232; 35.64%
New York	24th week and fetal viability	Legislature	Approved	Proposal 1	Prohibit a person's rights from being denied based on the person's reproductive choices, among others	Nov 5	>50%	4,757,097; 62.47%	2,857,663; 37.53%
South Dakota	Banned	Citizens	Failed	Amendment G	Enshrines abortion during the first trimester, with limits on regulation during the second trimester	Nov 5	>50%	176,809; 41.41%	250,136; 58.59%

=== Drug use policy ===
State	Origin	Status	Measure	Description (Result of a "yes" vote)	Date	% req.	Yes	No
Florida	Citizens	Failed	Amendment 3	Legalize marijuana for adults 21 years old and older and allow for individuals to possess up to three ounces of marijuana	Nov 5	60%	5,950,589; 55.90%	4,693,524; 44.10%
Massachusetts	Citizens	Failed	Question 4	Allow persons 21 years of age or older to grow, possess, and use natural psychedelic substances, as well as establish a commission to regulate the licensing of psychedelic substances and services.	Nov 5	>50%	1,444,812; 43.16%	1,902,207; 56.84%
Nebraska	Citizens	Approved	Initiative 437	Establish the Nebraska Medical Cannabis Commission to regulate the state's medical marijuana program.	Nov 5	>50%	637,126; 71.05%	259,643; 28.95%
Nebraska	Citizens	Approved	Initiative 438	Legalize the medical use of marijuana in the state	Nov 5	>50%	600,481; 67.29%	291,867; 32.71%
North Dakota	Citizens	Failed	Measure 5	Legalize recreational marijuana, allowing individuals to possess up to 1 oz of marijuana, 4g of concentrate, 300mg of edibles; and allowing for individuals to grow three plants with a limit of six plants per household.	Nov 5	>50%	172,174; 47.47%	190,548; 52.53%
South Dakota	Citizens	Failed	Measure 29	Legalize the recreational use, possession, and distribution of marijuana.	Nov 5	>50%	189,916; 44.46%	237,228; 55.54%

=== Labor ===
State	Origin	Status	Measure	Description (Result of a "yes" vote)	Date	% req.	Yes	No
Alaska	Citizens	Approved	Measure 1	Increases the minimum wage to $15/hr (currently $11.73/hr) by July 2027; provides 40–56 hours of paid sick leave a year depending on employer size; protects employees from being required to attend meetings on political and religious matters.	Nov 5	>50%	183,744; 57.98%	133,162; 42.02%
Arizona	Legislature	Failed	Proposition 138	Allow for tipped workers to be paid 25% less per hour than the minimum wage if any tips received by the employee were not less than the minimum wage plus $2 for all hours worked.	Nov 5	>50%	792,557; 25.24%	2,348,023; 74.76%
California	Citizens	Failed	Proposition 32	Increase the state minimum wage to $18 per hour by 2026 for all employers and thereafter adjusting the rate annually by increases to the cost of living.	Nov 5	>50%	7,469,803; 49.29%	7,686,126; 50.71%
Massachusetts	Citizens	Approved	Question 3	Provide for unionizing and collective bargaining for transportation network drivers, require the state to oversee the negotiations between the parties and approve the negotiated recommendations on wages, benefits, and terms and conditions of work, and require collective bargaining agreements to be approved by at least a majority of riders who have completed at least 100 trips during the previous quarter.	Nov 5	>50%	1,771,770; 54.08%	1,504,681; 45.92%
Massachusetts	Citizens	Failed	Question 5	Gradually increase the wage of tipped employees until it meets the state minimum wage in 2029 and continues to permit tipping in addition to the minimum wage.	Nov 5	>50%	1,200,980; 35.87%	2,147,245; 64.13%
Missouri	Legislature	Approved	Proposition A	Establish a $13.75 per hour minimum wage by 2025, which would be increased by $1.25 per hour each year until 2026, when the minimum wage is $15 per hour, and also requiring employers to provide one hour of paid sick leave for every 30 hours worked.	Nov 5	>50%	1,693,064; 57.57%	1,247,658; 42.43%
Nebraska	Citizens	Approved	Initiative 436	Require Nebraska businesses to offer earned paid sick leave for employees—up to seven days for businesses of at least 20 employees and five days for fewer than 20 employees.	Nov 5	>50%	662,348; 74.56%	225,974; 25.44%

=== Law and crime ===
State	Origin	Status	Measure	Description (Result of a "yes" vote)	Date	% req.	Yes	No
Arizona	Legislature	Approved	Proposition 313	Require that anyone convicted of child sex trafficking be sentenced to life in prison without the possibility of parole or release.	Nov 5	>50%	2,025,608; 64.54%	1,112,951; 35.46%
Arizona	Legislature	Approved	Proposition 314	Make it a state crime for noncitizens to enter the state at any location other than the port of entry; allow for state and local police to arrest noncitizens who cross the border unlawfully; allowing for state judges to order deportations; requiring the use of the E-Verify program in order to determine the immigration status of individuals before the enrollment in a financial aid or public welfare program; making it a Class 6 felony for individuals who submit false information or documents to an employer to evade detection of employment eligibility, or to apply for public benefits, and; make the sale of fentanyl a Class 2 felony if the person knowingly sells fentanyl and it results in the death of another person.	Nov 5	>50%	1,949,529; 62.59%	1,165,237; 37.41%
California	Legislature	Failed	Proposition 6	Eliminate the Constitutional provision permitting the use of involuntary servitude against incarcerated individuals.	Nov 5	>50%	6,895,604; 46.66%	7,882,137; 53.34%
California	Citizens	Approved	Proposition 36	Increase the penalties and sentences for certain drug and theft crimes from being only chargeable as misdemeanors. It would allow, among others, felony charges for possessing fentanyl and other certain drugs, and for thefts under $950, with two prior drug or theft convictions, respectively.	Nov 5	>50%	10,307,296; 68.42%	4,756,612; 31.58%
Colorado	Legislature	Approved	Amendment I	Remove the right to bail in cases of first-degree murder when the proof is evident or the presumption is great.	Nov 5	55%	2,058,063; 68.34%	953,653; 31.66%
Colorado	Citizens	Approved	Proposition 128	Requires any individual convicted of a violent felony offense to serve 85% of their sentence before being eligible for parole or any sentence reductions for good behavior.	Nov 5	>50%	1,869,231; 62.11%	1,140,284; 37.89%
Colorado	Citizens	Approved	Proposition 130	Create the Peace Officer Training and Support Fund to provide funding for law enforcement training, retention, and hiring; training surrounding the use of force; and death benefits for surviving spouses and children of officers or first responders killed in the line of duty.	Nov 5	>50%	1,583,118; 52.79%	1,415,528; 47.21%
Nevada	Legislature	Approved	Question 4	Remove Language in the Nevada State Constitution permitting the use of slavery and involuntary servitude as criminal punishments	Nov 5	>50%	835,627; 60.60%	543,236; 39.40%

=== LGBT rights ===
State	Origin	Status	Measure	Description (Result of a "yes" vote)	Date	% req.	Yes	No
California	Legislature	Approved	Proposition 3	Repeal Proposition 8 and the states Constitutional Amendment against same-sex marriage by declaring that a "right to marry is a fundamental right" in the California Constitution.	Nov 5	>50%	9,477,435; 62.62%	5,658,187; 37.38%
Colorado	Legislature	Approved	Amendment J	Repeal Amendment 43 and the state's Constitutional Amendment against same-sex marriage.	Nov 5	>50%	1,982,200; 64.33%	1,099,288; 35.37%
Hawaii	Legislature	Approved	Amendment 1	Repeal Amendment 2 and the Legislature's ability reserve marriage to opposite-sex couples.	Nov 5	>50%	268,038; 55.94%	211,142; 44.06%

=== Voting ===
State	Origin	Status	Measure	Description (Result of a "yes" vote)	Date	% req.	Yes	No
Alaska	Citizens	Failed	Measure 2	Repeal Alaska's electoral system of ranked-choice (instant-runoff) voting and nonpartisan blanket primaries and return the state to partisan primaries and plurality voting	Nov 5	>50%	160,124; 49.89%	160,861; 50.11%
Arizona	Legislature	Failed	Proposition 133	Require partisan primary elections for partisan offices and prohibit primary elections where all candidates, regardless of political party affiliation, run in the same primary election, such as top-two, top-four, and top-five primaries	Nov 5	>50%	1,286,640; 42.18%	1,763,711; 57.82%
Arizona	Citizens	Failed	Proposition 140	Require primaries in which candidates, regardless of partisan affiliation, appear on a single ballot and a certain number advance to the general election, and require general election candidates to receive a majority of votes	Nov 5	>50%	1,284,176; 41.32%	1,823,445; 58.68%
Colorado	Citizens	Failed	Proposition 131	Establish top-four primaries and ranked-choice voting for federal and state offices in Colorado	Nov 5	>50%	1,385,060; 46.47%	1,595,256; 53.53%
District of Columbia	Citizens	Approved	Initiative 83	Allows independent voters to participate in partisan primaries and implements ranked-choice voting.	Nov 5	>50%	212,332; 72.89%	78,961; 27.11%
Iowa	Legislature	Approved	Amendment 1	Prohibits state and local governments from allowing non-citizens to vote, and would allow some 17-year-olds to vote in primaries, provided they turn 18 by the next general election.	Nov 5	>50%	1,150,332; 77.13%	341,034; 22.87%
Idaho	Citizens	Failed	Proposition 1	Implements a top-four nonpartisan blanket primary; with ranked-choice voting for the general election for state, county, and federal offices.	Nov 5	>50%	269,959; 30.38%	618,751; 69.62%
Idaho	Legislature	Passed	Citizenship Requirement for Voting	Prohibits state and local governments from allowing non-citizens to vote.	Nov 5	>50%	572,865; 64.93%	309,456; 35.07%
Kentucky	Legislature	Passed	Amendment 1	Prohibits state and local governments from allowing non-citizens to vote.	Nov 5	>50%	1,208,898; 62.43%	727,515; 37.57%
Missouri	Legislature	Approved	Amendment 7	Prohibits state and local governments from allowing non-citizens to vote, and ban ranked-choice voting in the state.	Nov 5	>50%	1,966,852; 68.44%	906,851; 31.56%
Montana	Citizens	Failed	CI-126	Establish top-four primaries for federal and state offices in Montana	Nov 5	>50%	287,837; 48.91%	300,664; 51.09%
Montana	Citizens	Failed	CI-127	Require an electoral system in which candidates for certain offices must win a majority of the vote, rather than a plurality, to win the election	Nov 5	>50%	228,908; 39.62%	348,805; 60.38%
Nevada	Citizens	Failed	Question 3	Establish top-five primaries and ranked-choice voting for federal and state offices in Nevada	Nov 5	>50%	664,011; 47.04%	747,719; 52.96%
North Carolina	Legislature	Approved	Citizenship Requirement for Voting Amendment	Prohibit the state and local governments from allowing noncitizens to vote	Nov 5	>50%	4,184,680; 77.59%	1,208,865; 22.41%
Oklahoma	Legislature	Approved	Question 834	Prohibits the state and local governments from allowing noncitizens to vote	Nov 5	>50%	1,207,520; 80.73%	288,267; 19.27%
Oregon	Legislature	Failed	Measure 117	Establish ranked-choice voting for federal and state offices in Oregon	Nov 5	>50%	893,668; 42.30%	1,219,013; 57.70%
South Carolina	Legislature	Approved	Amendment 1	Prohibits the state and local governments from allowing noncitizens to vote.	Nov 5	>50%	1,982,956; 85.94%	324,432; 14.06%
South Dakota	Citizens	Failed	Amendment H	Establish top-two primaries for federal, state, and certain local offices in South Dakota	Nov 5	>50%	141,570; 34.39%	270,048; 65.51%
Wisconsin	Legislature	Approved	Citizenship Voting Requirement Amendment	Prohibit the state and local governments from allowing noncitizens to vote	Nov 5	>50%	2,272,446; 70.51%	950,445; 29.49%
