= Alabama Amendment 1 =

Alabama Amendment 1 can refer to several amendments:

- 1999 Alabama Amendment 1
- 2020 Alabama Amendment 1
- 2022 Alabama Amendment 1
- March 2024 Alabama Amendment 1
- November 2024 Alabama Amendment 1
- May 2026 Alabama Amendment 1
- November 2026 Alabama Amendment 1
