= 2024 Arizona Proposition 140 =

- November 5, 2024
- Single Primary for All Candidates and Possible RCV General Election Initiative

Results
Choice	Votes	%
Yes	1,284,176	41.32%
No	1,823,445	58.68%
County results
Yes
50–60%
No
60–70%
50–60%

Arizona Proposition 140, officially the Single Primary for All Candidates and Possible RCV General Election Initiative, was an initiated constitutional amendment on the November 5, 2024 ballot in Arizona. The amendment would have replaced partisan primaries with nonpartisan primaries in which all candidates appear on a single ballot. It would have also required an electoral threshold of 50% in general elections, possibly done by introducing the use of ranked-choice voting.

== Background ==
The state of Arizona uses semi-closed partisan primaries, where voters registered with political parties choose their party's candidates for a general election, and independents can participate in one party's primaries. (Note: For a specific election, a registered independent could choose to vote in a Republican primary, but not a Democratic primary, and vice versa.) Arizona voters elect two candidates per district to the Arizona House of Representatives, and one to the Arizona Senate.

General elections use a plurality voting system; the candidate – or candidates, for the state house – who receives the highest number of votes is elected to the office.

== Effect ==
Under Proposition 140, partisan primaries would have been replaced with a single ballot, with a certain number of candidates advancing to the general election. The state legislature would have needed to pass a bill to determine the specific number of candidates that would have advanced from primaries to general elections.

Candidates in general elections would have needed a majority of the votes to win. If the state legislature opted for a top-two primary system, where two candidates advance to the general election, one candidate would inherently win more than half the votes. If the legislature opted for a top-three, top-four, or top-five primary, where multiple candidates advance to the general election, ranked-choice voting would be used to eliminate candidates until one achieves a majority.

Additionally, Proposition 140 would have amended the state constitution to prohibit denying a citizens rights to vote, hold office, or vote for candidates based on their political affiliation. It would have also banned the use of public funds to administer partisan primaries.

== Endorsements ==
Yes

U.S. senators

- Dennis DeConcini, former U.S. senator from Arizona (1977–1995) (Democratic)

Statewide officials

- Fife Symington, former governor of Arizona (1991–1997) (Republican)
- Terry Goddard, former attorney general of Arizona (2003–2011) (Democratic)

State legislators

- Rusty Bowers, former speaker of the Arizona House of Representatives (2019–2023) from the 25th district (1993–1997, 2015–2023) (Republican)
- Aaron Lieberman, former state representative from the 28th district (2019–2021) (Democratic)
- Art Hamilton, former state representative from the 22nd district (1973–1999) (Democratic)

Local officials

- Paul Johnson, former mayor of Phoenix (1990–1994) (No Labels; elected as a Democrat)
- John Giles, former mayor of Mesa (2014–2025) (Republican)

Labor unions

- Professional Fire Fighters of Arizona

Organizations

- East Valley Partnership
- Open Primaries
- RepresentUs
- Unite America

Political parties

- Forward Party

Newspapers

- The Arizona Republic
- Arizona Daily Star
No

Executive branch officials

- Jeff DeWit, former CFO of NASA (2018–2020) and treasurer of Arizona (2015–2018) (Republican)

U.S. representatives

- Andy Biggs, AZ-05 (2017–present) (Republican)
- Abraham Hamadeh, AZ-08 (2025–present) (Republican)

State officials

- Andrew Gould, former justice of the Arizona Supreme Court (2016–2021) (Republican)

State legislators

- Warren Petersen, president of the Arizona Senate (2023–present) from the 14th district (2017–2019, 2021–present) (Republican)
- Ben Toma, former speaker of the Arizona House of Representatives (2023–2025) from the 27th district (2017–2025) (Republican)
- Jake Hoffman, state senator from the 15th district (2023–present) (Republican)
- Alexander Kolodin, state representative from the 3rd district (2023–present) (Republican)
- Analise Ortiz, state senator from the 14th district (2025–present) (Democratic)

Local officials

- Regina Romero, mayor of Tucson (2019–present) (Democratic)
- Mark Lamb, former sheriff of Pinal County (2017–2024) (Republican)

Individuals

- Nancy Cottle, fake elector in the 2020 presidential election (Republican)

Organizations

- Center for Arizona Policy
- Heritage Action
- Turning Point Action
- Goldwater Institute
- League of Women Voters Arizona
- Planned Parenthood Arizona

Political parties

- Arizona Republican Party
- Arizona Democratic Party
- Arizona Green Party
- Arizona Working Families Party

== Results ==
Proposition 140
Choice	Votes	%
For	1,284,176	41.32
Against	1,823,445	58.68
Total	3,107,621	100.00

== See also ==
- 2024 United States ballot measures
