= 2024 South Dakota Amendment E =

- November 5, 2024
- Gender-Neutral Constitutional Language Amendment

Results
| Choice | Votes | % |
|---|---|---|
| Yes | 180,365 | 42.62% |
| No | 242,866 | 57.38% |
| Valid votes | 423,231 | 100.00% |
| Invalid or blank votes | 0 | 0.00% |
| Total votes | 423,231 | 100.00% |
| Registered voters/turnout | 624,186 | 67.81% |
County results
No
80–90%
70–80%
60–70%
50–60%
Yes
50–60%

South Dakota Amendment E was a proposed constitutional amendment that appeared on the ballot on November 5, 2024. The measure would have amended the text of the South Dakota Constitution to change male pronouns to gender-neutral pronouns. The measure was proposed and passed by the South Dakota Legislature in 2023 and was validated for the ballot on March 7, 2023. Four states, California, Hawaii, New York, and Vermont, already do not use any gendered pronouns in their state constitutions. It needed a majority approval to pass, but it received 42.62% (180,365) votes in favor of and 57.38% (242,866) against.

== Text ==
For example, this is how Article IV, Section 3 of the South Dakota Constitution would have been amended. ~~Struck text~~ would have been replaced with the underlined text.

§3. The Governor shall be responsible for the faithful execution of the law. ~~He~~ The Governor may, by appropriate action or proceeding brought in the name of the state, enforce compliance with any constitutional or legislative mandate, or restrain violation of any constitutional or legislative power, duty or right by any officer, department or agency of the state or any of its civil divisions. This authority shall not authorize any action or proceedings against the Legislature.

~~He~~ The Governor shall be commander-in-chief of the armed forces of the state, except when they shall be called into the service of the United States, and may call them out to execute the laws, to preserve order, to suppress insurrection or to repel invasion.

The Governor shall commission all officers of the state. ~~He~~ The Governor may at any time require information, in writing or otherwise, from the officers of any administrative department, office or agency upon any subject relating to the respective offices.

The Governor shall at the beginning of each session, and may at other times, give the Legislature information concerning the affairs of the state and recommend the measures ~~he~~ the Governor considers necessary.

The Governor may convene the Legislature or either house thereof alone in special session by a proclamation stating the purposes of the session, and only business encompassed by such purposes shall be transacted.

Whenever a vacancy occurs in any office and no provision is made by the Constitution or laws for filling such vacancy, the Governor shall have the power to fill such vacancy by appointment.

The Governor may, except as to convictions on impeachment, grant pardons, commutations, and reprieves, and may suspend and remit fines and forfeitures.

== Endorsements ==
Yes
- Jess Olson, state representative from the 34th district (2019–2023) (Republican)
- Becky Drury, state representative from the 32nd district (2021–2024) and the 34th district (2024–present) (Republican)
No
- Bethany Soye, state representative from the 9th district (2019–present) (Republican)

== Results ==
2024 South Dakota Amendment E
| Choice | Votes | % |
|---|---|---|
| For | 180,365 | 42.62 |
| Against | 242,866 | 57.38 |
| Total | 423,231 | 100.00 |
Source: South Dakota Secretary of State

=== By county ===
| County | No | | Yes | | Margin | | Total |
| County | # | % | # | % | # | % | Total |
|---|---|---|---|---|---|---|---|
| Aurora | 1,040 | 75.25% | 342 | 24.75% | 698 | 50.51% | 1,382 |
| Beadle | 4,326 | 62.24% | 2,624 | 37.76% | 1,702 | 24.49% | 6,950 |
| Bennett | 687 | 65.12% | 368 | 34.88% | 319 | 30.24% | 1,055 |
| Bon Homme | 2,052 | 68.95% | 924 | 31.05% | 1,128 | 37.90% | 2,976 |
| Brookings | 7,749 | 52.24% | 7,085 | 47.76% | 664 | 4.48% | 14,834 |
| Brown | 9,728 | 57.94% | 7,061 | 42.06% | 2,667 | 15.89% | 16,789 |
| Brule | 1,650 | 68.32% | 765 | 31.68% | 885 | 36.65% | 2,415 |
| Buffalo | 287 | 63.92% | 162 | 36.08% | 125 | 27.84% | 449 |
| Butte | 3,525 | 70.33% | 1,487 | 29.67% | 2,038 | 40.66% | 5,012 |
| Campbell | 559 | 68.25% | 260 | 31.75% | 299 | 36.51% | 819 |
| Charles Mix | 2,445 | 68.16% | 1,142 | 31.84% | 1,303 | 36.33% | 3,587 |
| Clark | 1,220 | 67.93% | 576 | 32.07% | 644 | 35.86% | 1,796 |
| Clay | 2,586 | 45.95% | 3,042 | 54.05% | −456 | −8.10% | 5,628 |
| Codington | 8,110 | 61.56% | 5,064 | 38.44% | 3,046 | 23.12% | 13,174 |
| Corson | 694 | 61.74% | 430 | 38.26% | 264 | 23.49% | 1,124 |
| Custer | 3,767 | 63.54% | 2,162 | 36.46% | 1,605 | 27.07% | 5,929 |
| Davison | 5,499 | 60.80% | 3,545 | 39.20% | 1,954 | 21.61% | 9,044 |
| Day | 1,772 | 61.68% | 1,101 | 38.32% | 671 | 23.36% | 2,873 |
| Deuel | 1,514 | 66.84% | 751 | 33.16% | 763 | 33.69% | 2,265 |
| Dewey | 1,017 | 54.94% | 834 | 45.06% | 183 | 9.89% | 1,851 |
| Douglas | 1,320 | 80.68% | 316 | 19.32% | 1,004 | 61.37% | 1,636 |
| Edmunds | 1,451 | 71.87% | 568 | 28.13% | 883 | 43.73% | 2,019 |
| Fall River | 2,782 | 65.77% | 1,448 | 34.23% | 1,334 | 31.54% | 4,230 |
| Faulk | 789 | 71.34% | 317 | 28.66% | 472 | 41.68% | 1,106 |
| Grant | 2,384 | 66.70% | 1,190 | 33.30% | 1,194 | 33.41% | 3,574 |
| Gregory | 1,702 | 75.71% | 546 | 24.29% | 1,156 | 51.42% | 2,248 |
| Haakon | 882 | 79.25% | 231 | 20.75% | 651 | 58.49% | 1,113 |
| Hamlin | 2,240 | 70.44% | 940 | 29.56% | 1,300 | 40.88% | 3,180 |
| Hand | 1,203 | 68.90% | 543 | 31.10% | 660 | 37.80% | 1,746 |
| Hanson | 1,343 | 66.95% | 663 | 33.05% | 680 | 33.90% | 2,006 |
| Harding | 702 | 86.56% | 109 | 13.44% | 593 | 73.12% | 811 |
| Hughes | 4,573 | 54.09% | 3,882 | 45.91% | 691 | 8.17% | 8,455 |
| Hutchinson | 2,452 | 66.58% | 1,231 | 33.42% | 1,221 | 33.15% | 3,683 |
| Hyde | 480 | 69.06% | 215 | 30.94% | 265 | 38.13% | 695 |
| Jackson | 802 | 71.29% | 323 | 28.71% | 479 | 42.58% | 1,125 |
| Jerauld | 674 | 68.85% | 305 | 31.15% | 369 | 37.69% | 979 |
| Jones | 426 | 77.74% | 122 | 22.26% | 304 | 55.47% | 548 |
| Kingsbury | 1,827 | 65.70% | 954 | 34.30% | 873 | 31.39% | 2,781 |
| Lake | 3,428 | 58.55% | 2,427 | 41.45% | 1,001 | 17.10% | 5,855 |
| Lawrence | 8,790 | 57.70% | 6,445 | 42.30% | 2,345 | 15.39% | 15,235 |
| Lincoln | 18,970 | 52.77% | 16,977 | 47.23% | 1,993 | 5.54% | 35,947 |
| Lyman | 963 | 66.88% | 477 | 33.13% | 486 | 33.75% | 1,440 |
| Marshall | 1,283 | 61.07% | 818 | 38.93% | 465 | 22.13% | 2,101 |
| McCook | 1,947 | 64.47% | 1,073 | 35.53% | 874 | 28.94% | 3,020 |
| McPherson | 910 | 71.15% | 369 | 28.85% | 541 | 42.30% | 1,279 |
| Meade | 9,459 | 65.01% | 5,091 | 34.99% | 4,368 | 30.02% | 14,550 |
| Mellette | 470 | 64.38% | 260 | 35.62% | 210 | 28.77% | 730 |
| Miner | 795 | 69.61% | 347 | 30.39% | 448 | 39.23% | 1,142 |
| Minnehaha | 46,156 | 49.96% | 46,231 | 50.04% | −75 | −0.08% | 92,387 |
| Moody | 1,992 | 62.74% | 1,183 | 37.26% | 809 | 25.48% | 3,175 |
| Oglala Lakota | 1,222 | 40.92% | 1,764 | 59.08% | −542 | −18.15% | 2,986 |
| Pennington | 30,434 | 54.52% | 25,391 | 45.48% | 5,043 | 9.03% | 55,825 |
| Perkins | 1,155 | 73.01% | 427 | 26.99% | 728 | 46.02% | 1,582 |
| Potter | 878 | 68.38% | 406 | 31.62% | 472 | 36.76% | 1,284 |
| Roberts | 2,350 | 57.53% | 1,735 | 42.47% | 615 | 15.06% | 4,085 |
| Sanborn | 820 | 68.68% | 374 | 31.32% | 446 | 37.35% | 1,194 |
| Spink | 2,066 | 66.39% | 1,046 | 33.61% | 1,020 | 32.78% | 3,112 |
| Stanley | 1,069 | 62.48% | 642 | 37.52% | 427 | 24.96% | 1,711 |
| Sully | 627 | 69.59% | 274 | 30.41% | 353 | 39.18% | 901 |
| Todd | 917 | 43.58% | 1,187 | 56.42% | −270 | −12.83% | 2,104 |
| Tripp | 1,932 | 72.91% | 718 | 27.09% | 1,214 | 45.81% | 2,650 |
| Turner | 3,071 | 68.03% | 1,443 | 31.97% | 1,628 | 36.07% | 4,514 |
| Union | 4,917 | 56.58% | 3,773 | 43.42% | 1,144 | 13.16% | 8,690 |
| Walworth | 1,602 | 66.89% | 793 | 33.11% | 809 | 33.78% | 2,395 |
| Yankton | 5,929 | 55.57% | 4,740 | 44.43% | 1,189 | 11.14% | 10,669 |
| Ziebach | 455 | 58.26% | 326 | 41.74% | 129 | 16.52% | 781 |
| Totals | 242,866 | 57.38% | 180,365 | 42.62% | 62,501 | 14.77% | 423,231 |

== See also ==
- 2024 South Dakota Amendment H
- 2024 South Dakota Amendment G
- 2024 United States ballot measures
