= Sherri Gallick =

Missouri politician

Member of the Missouri House of Representatives from the 62nd district
- Incumbent
- Assumed office January 4, 2023
- Preceded by: Bruce Sassmann

Personal details
- Born: Kansas City, Missouri, U.S.
- Party: Republican
- Education: University of Missouri; Webster University
- Website: sherri4missouri

Sherri Elaine Gallick is an American politician serving as a Republican member of the Missouri House of Representatives, representing the state's 62nd House district. She began serving in the Missouri House in 2023.

Professionally she worked as an executive in the food industry with Jimmy Dean Food. In 2023 she was awarded “Freshman Legislator of the Year" by the Missouri Chamber of Commerce. In 2025, Gallick received the Capitol Impact Award from the Missouri Retail Grocers Association and the Defender of Business Award from the Missouri Chamber.

In 2025, Gallick sponsored a bill challenging sick leave provisions in a law passed by voters in the 2024 election. She argued that sick leave would be abused by workers, however opposition pointed out that at-will employment is still in place. The initial bill only postponed the law's implementation, and Gallick presented a substitute bill to the committee. Gallick received feedback from business owners throughout the state saying the action would cause business to reduce workforce and could force some to close their doors. Gallick said she wanted everyone to have great benefits, but believes this should be decided by businesses, not through mandates. She stated she does not want to see businesses relocate across the state lines.

Gallick has passed many other bills that have been signed into law. In 2023, she sponsored Blair's Law, increasing penalties for celebratory gunfire, and in 2026 she sponsored and passed measures requiring age verification before granting minors access to pornography. In 2026 she also sponsored and passed a bill implementing a new public alert system, RJ's Law, the Purple Alert System. The alert will send out geographic notification to the public when someone with cognitive or developmental disability goes missing. Gallick passed 14 bills that were signed into law from 2025–2026.
