= 2024 Colorado Proposition 127 =

Ballot measure in Colorado regarding hunting

Proposition 127
- November 5, 2024
- Prohibit Bobcat, Lynx, and Mountain Lion Hunting

Results
Choice	Votes	%
Yes	1,382,048	45.26%
No	1,671,710	54.74%
Total votes	3,053,758	100.00%
County results
For
50–60%
Against
90–100%
80–90%
70–80%
60–70%
50–60%

2024 Colorado Proposition 127 was a proposed ballot measure that appeared before voters in Colorado during the 2024 general election. If the citizen initiated proposition had passed, it would have made it illegal to hunt and kill bobcats, mountain lions, and lynx in Colorado.

== Background ==
Currently, hunting bobcats and mountain lions is legal in Colorado and regulated by Colorado Parks and Wildlife. Of the roughly 4,000 mountain lions in Colorado, 504 were killed during the 2022–23 hunting seasons, with hunters being required to take training courses and report all kills within 48 hours of killing an animal. The state collects over $400,000 in revenue annually from big cat hunting licenses. Hunting lynx is already illegal in Colorado and remained so regardless of Proposition 127's failure to pass.

Proposition 127 was referred to the ballot through citizen petition. Petitions were circulated by the group Cats Aren't Trophys and largely funded by animal rights organizations. They gathered just under 150,000 signatures to put Proposition 127 on the ballot. Had voters approve the measure, bobcat and mountain lion hunting would have become illegal in Colorado.

== Contents ==
The proposition appeared on the ballot as follows:

Shall there be a change to the Colorado Revised Statutes concerning a prohibition on the hunting of mountain lions, lynx, and bobcats, and, in connection therewith, prohibiting the intentional killing, wounding, pursuing, entrapping, or discharging or releasing of a deadly weapon at a mountain lion, lynx, or bobcat; creating eight exceptions to this prohibition including for the protection of human life, property, and livestock; establishing a violation of this prohibition as a class 1 misdemeanor; and increasing fines and limiting wildlife license privileges for persons convicted of this crime?

== Campaigns ==
=== Support ===
The main campaign in favor of Proposition 127 was led by the group Cats Aren't Trophies. Colorado's official voter guide offered the arguments that hunting big cats is inhumane and supports the unnecessary practice of commercial fur trade. It went on to argue big cat populations in Colorado can self regulate and would not become a public danger without hunters.

'Yes'

Organizations

- Audubon Society
- Big Cat Rescue
- Black Pine Animal Sanctuary
- Carolina Tiger Rescue
- Center for Biological Diversity
- Friends of Animals
- Global Federation of Animal Sanctuaries
- Humane Society of Boulder Valley
- In Defense of Animals
- Performing Animal Welfare Society
- Sierra Club Rocky Mountain Chapter
- The Wild Animal Sanctuary
- WildEarth Guardians

=== Opposition ===
There are two organizations which led opposition to Proposition 127. They were Colorado's Wildlife Deserve Better and Western Heritage Conservation Alliance. The state's official voter guide also offered the arguments that Proposition 127 would have restricted Colorado Parks and Wildlife's ability to manage big cat populations, lynx hunting is already illegal in Colorado, and hunting mountain lions and bobcats provides an important revenue source to wildlife management systems and local communities.

'No'

State senators

- Perry Will

Organizations

- Colorado Republican Party

== Polling ==
Poll source	Date(s) administered	Sample size (Note: Key: A – all adults RV – registered voters LV – likely voters V – unclear)	Margin of error	Yes	No	Undecided
YouGov	October 18–30, 2024	754 (LV)	± 4.5%	57%	30%	13%

== Results ==
Proposition 127 required a simple majority to pass. It failed with only 45% of voters supporting the measure.

Proposition 127
Choice	Votes	%
For	1,382,048	45.26
Against	1,671,710	54.74
Total	3,053,758	100.00

=== Results by county ===
County	For		Against		Margin		Total votes cast
County	#	%	#	%	#	%	Total votes cast
Adams	106,282	48.58%	112,511	51.42%	-6,229	-2.85%	218,793
Alamosa	2,582	36.12%	4,567	63.88%	-1,985	-27.77%	7,149
Arapahoe	156,021	50.54%	152,708	49.46%	3,313	1.07%	308,729
Archuleta	3,057	34.06%	5,918	65.94%	-2,861	-31.88%	8,975
Baca	335	17.38%	1,593	82.62%	-1,258	-65.25%	1,928
Bent	619	29.39%	1,487	70.61%	-868	-41.22%	2,106
Boulder	110,045	59.05%	76,306	40.95%	33,739	18.11%	186,351
Broomfield	22,639	50.50%	22,188	49.50%	451	1.01%	44,827
Chaffee	4,989	35.60%	9,027	64.40%	-4,038	-28.81%	14,016
Cheyenne	137	13.37%	888	86.63%	-751	-73.27%	1,025
Clear Creek	2,263	38.36%	3,636	61.64%	-1,373	-23.28%	5,899
Conejos	995	24.83%	3,013	75.17%	-2,018	-50.35%	4,008
Costilla	830	42.46%	1,125	57.54%	-295	-15.09%	1,955
Crowley	513	30.68%	1,159	69.32%	-646	-38.64%	1,672
Custer	1,114	29.32%	2,685	70.68%	-1,571	-41.35%	3,799
Delta	5,098	26.73%	13,972	73.27%	-8,874	-46.53%	19,070
Denver	195,313	56.90%	147,921	43.10%	47,392	13.81%	343,234
Dolores	257	18.48%	1,134	81.52%	-877	-63.05%	1,391
Douglas	96,607	41.43%	136,573	58.57%	-39,966	-17.14%	233,180
Eagle	10,342	39.02%	16,163	60.98%	-5,821	-21.96%	26,505
El Paso	171,772	46.78%	195,415	53.22%	-23,643	-6.44%	367,187
Elbert	4,886	24.47%	15,084	75.53%	-10,198	-51.07%	19,970
Fremont	7,833	31.31%	17,181	68.69%	-9,348	-37.37%	25,014
Garfield	9,786	33.28%	19,621	66.72%	-9,835	-33.44%	29,407
Gilpin	1,533	38.09%	2,492	61.91%	-959	-23.83%	4,025
Grand	2,327	23.89%	7,413	76.11%	-5,086	-52.22%	9,740
Gunnison	3,147	29.71%	7,445	70.29%	-4,298	-40.58%	10,592
Hinsdale	185	30.78%	416	69.22%	-231	-38.44%	601
Huerfano	1,670	38.67%	2,649	61.33%	-979	-22.67%	4,319
Jackson	84	10.19%	740	89.81%	-656	-79.61%	824
Jefferson	158,481	45.49%	189,931	54.51%	-31,450	-9.03%	348,412
Kiowa	135	16.11%	703	83.89%	-568	-67.78%	838
Kit Carson	724	20.38%	2,828	79.62%	-2,104	-59.23%	3,552
La Plata	15,066	44.12%	19,085	55.88%	-4,019	-11.77%	34,151
Lake	1,420	37.29%	2,388	62.71%	-968	-25.42%	3,808
Larimer	93,401	43.24%	122,613	56.76%	-29,212	-13.52%	216,014
Las Animas	2,705	36.07%	4,794	63.93%	-2,089	-27.86%	7,499
Lincoln	506	19.98%	2,026	80.02%	-1,520	-60.03%	2,532
Logan	2,562	26.12%	7,246	73.88%	-4,684	-47.76%	9,808
Mesa	29,695	33.28%	59,525	66.72%	-29,830	-33.43%	89,220
Mineral	188	25.75%	542	74.25%	-354	-48.49%	730
Moffat	872	13.32%	5,675	86.68%	-4,803	-73.36%	6,547
Montezuma	4,545	31.20%	10,021	68.80%	-5,476	-37.59%	14,566
Montrose	6,884	27.67%	17,992	72.33%	-11,108	-44.65%	24,876
Morgan	3,775	28.99%	9,247	71.01%	-5,472	-42.02%	13,022
Otero	3,000	34.51%	5,693	65.49%	-2,693	-30.98%	8,693
Ouray	1,760	44.64%	2,183	55.36%	-423	-10.73%	3,943
Park	3,514	29.63%	8,344	70.37%	-4,830	-40.73%	11,858
Phillips	475	21.37%	1,748	78.63%	-1,273	-57.26%	2,223
Pitkin	4,681	44.84%	5,758	55.16%	-1,077	-10.32%	10,439
Prowers	1,327	26.70%	3,643	73.30%	-2,316	-46.60%	4,970
Pueblo	36,653	44.75%	45,248	55.25%	-8,595	-10.49%	81,901
Rio Blanco	328	8.95%	3,337	91.05%	-3,009	-82.10%	3,665
Rio Grande	1,750	28.82%	4,323	71.18%	-2,573	-42.37%	6,073
Routt	5,299	33.24%	10,645	66.76%	-5,346	-33.53%	15,944
Saguache	1,411	43.67%	1,820	56.33%	-409	-12.66%	3,231
San Juan	296	53.82%	254	46.18%	42	7.64%	550
San Miguel	2,534	55.59%	2,024	44.41%	510	11.19%	4,558
Sedgwick	315	24.65%	963	75.35%	-648	-50.70%	1,278
Summit	6,553	39.39%	10,085	60.61%	-3,532	-21.23%	16,638
Teller	5,347	33.46%	10,634	66.54%	-5,287	-33.08%	15,981
Washington	434	15.82%	2,310	84.18%	-1,876	-68.37%	2,744
Weld	61,392	35.56%	111,261	64.44%	-49,869	-28.88%	172,653
Yuma	759	16.68%	3,791	83.32%	-3,032	-66.64%	4,550
Total	1,382,048	45.26%	1,671,710	54.74%	-289,662	-9.49%	3,053,758

== See also ==
- 2024 United States ballot measures
