= 2024 Idaho Proposition 1 =

- November 5, 2024
- Measure to (1) Replace Voter Selection of Party Nominees with a Top-four Primary; (2) Require a Ranked-choice Voting System for General Elections

Results
Choice	Votes	%
Yes	269,959	30.38%
No	618,751	69.62%
Total votes	888,710	100.00%

No
90–100%
80–90%
70–80%
60–70%
50–60%
Yes
80–90%
70–80%
60–70%
50–60%
Other
Tie
No votes

The Idaho Open Primary measure or Idaho Proposition 1 was a ballot initiative in the state of Idaho that was defeated on November 5, 2024, as part of the 2024 United States elections. If enacted, the initiative would have ended Idaho's system of closed primaries, replacing it with a top-four primary, and implement a ranked-choice voting system for the general election to replace the current plurality voting system. This would apply to congressional, gubernatorial, and state and county elected offices. Top-four primaries with ranked-choice general elections are currently in use in Alaska. The proposition was certified for the ballot on July 10, 2024.

== Endorsements ==
Yes

Statewide officials

- Butch Otter, former Governor of Idaho (2007–2019) (Republican)

State legislators

- Bruce Newcomb, former Speaker of the Idaho House of Representatives (1999–2006) (Republican)
No

Statewide officials

- Raúl Labrador, attorney general (2023–present) (Republican)

State party officials

- Dorothy Moon, chair of the Idaho Republican Party (2022–present) and state representative from district 8B (2018–2022) (Republican)

Organizations

- Idaho Freedom Foundation
- Idaho Republican Party

== See also ==
- 2024 United States ballot measures
- Ranked-choice voting in the United States
