= 2024 Colorado Amendment I =

Amendment I
- November 5, 2024
- Constitutional Bail Exception for First Degree Murder

Results
Choice	Votes	%
Yes	2,058,063	68.34%
No	953,652	31.66%
Total votes	3,011,715	100.00%
County results
For
70–80%
60–70%
50–60%

2024 Colorado Amendment I was a proposed amendment to the Colorado Constitution that appeared on the general election ballot on November 5, 2024, in Colorado. The measure allows judges to deny bail to individuals accused of first degree murder in cases where there is enough evidence for the judge to presume the defendant will eventually be convicted. As the ballot measure modified the state Constitution, it required a 55% majority to pass.

== Background ==
In 2020, the Colorado General Assembly abolished the death penalty within the state. Since Colorado law only allows denial of bail for capital offenses, abolishing the death penalty inadvertently removed the ability of judges in the state to deny bail. This was made official by the Colorado Supreme Court decision People v. Smith. This led to bipartisan calls to restore the ability of judges to deny bail when "proof is evident or presumtion is great".

On February 8, 2024, Representatives Monica Duran and Mike Lynch and Senators Rhonda Fields and Bob Gardner introduced House Concurrent Resolution 24-1002 to refer the issue of creating an exemption for the right to bail in suspected cases of first degree murder to voters. The bill passed the Colorado House of Representatives with bipartisan support and was then passed by the Colorado Senate unanimously.

March 4, 2024 vote in the Colorado House of Representatives
Political affiliation	Voted for	Voted against	Abstained/Not present
Democratic Party	41	4: Elisabeth Epps; Lorena Garcia; Tim Hernández; Javier Mabrey	1: Regina English
Republican Party	18	1: Rod Bockenfeld	-
Total	59	5	1

March 28, 2024 vote in the Colorado Senate
Political affiliation	Voted for	Voted against	Abstained/Not present
Democratic Party	23	-	-
Republican Party	12	-	-
Total	35	-	-

== Contents ==
The amendment appeared on the ballot as follows:

Shall there be an amendment to the Colorado constitution concerning creating an exception to the right to bail for cases of murder in the first degree when proof is evident or presumption is great?

== Results ==
Amendment I required a 55% majority to pass. It was approved by voters with roughly two-thirds voting in favor of the amendment.

Amendment I
Choice	Votes	%
For	2,058,063	68.34
Against	953,652	31.66
Total	3,011,715	100.00

=== Results by county ===
County	For		Against		Margin		Total votes cast
County	#	%	#	%	#	%	Total votes cast
Adams	138,772	64.11%	77,684	35.89%	61,088	28.22%	216,456
Alamosa	4,346	61.83%	2,683	38.17%	1,663	23.66%	7,029
Arapahoe	209,355	68.12%	97,989	31.88%	111,366	36.23%	307,344
Archuleta	5,926	68.09%	2,777	31.91%	3,149	36.18%	8,703
Baca	973	51.05%	933	48.95%	40	2.10%	1,906
Bent	1,245	59.57%	845	40.43%	400	19.14%	2,090
Boulder	135,076	74.04%	47,350	25.96%	87,726	48.09%	182,426
Broomfield	32,609	73.46%	11,782	26.54%	20,827	46.92%	44,391
Chaffee	9,411	68.77%	4,273	31.23%	5,138	37.55%	13,684
Cheyenne	592	58.33%	423	41.67%	169	16.65%	1,015
Clear Creek	3,907	68.17%	1,824	31.83%	2,083	36.35%	5,731
Conejos	2,102	53.51%	1,826	46.49%	276	7.03%	3,928
Costilla	1,018	54.06%	865	45.94%	153	8.13%	1,883
Crowley	1,017	61.97%	624	38.03%	393	23.95%	1,641
Custer	2,608	70.35%	1,099	29.65%	1,509	40.71%	3,707
Delta	12,284	65.87%	6,366	34.13%	5,918	31.73%	18,650
Denver	228,711	67.84%	108,423	32.16%	120,288	35.68%	337,134
Dolores	812	61.01%	519	38.99%	293	22.01%	1,331
Douglas	170,991	73.64%	61,197	26.36%	109,794	47.29%	232,188
Eagle	17,676	68.43%	8,153	31.57%	9,523	36.87%	25,829
El Paso	248,991	68.71%	113,403	31.29%	135,588	37.41%	362,394
Elbert	13,537	68.79%	6,141	31.21%	7,396	37.59%	19,678
Fremont	16,029	65.29%	8,521	34.71%	7,508	30.58%	24,550
Garfield	19,154	66.54%	9,631	33.46%	9,523	33.08%	28,785
Gilpin	2,751	69.45%	1,210	30.55%	1,541	38.90%	3,961
Grand	6,199	65.99%	3,195	34.01%	3,004	31.98%	9,394
Gunnison	7,233	70.70%	2,998	29.30%	4,235	41.39%	10,231
Hinsdale	391	69.08%	175	30.92%	216	38.16%	566
Huerfano	2,666	63.72%	1,518	36.28%	1,148	27.44%	4,184
Jackson	453	58.00%	328	42.00%	125	16.01%	781
Jefferson	244,135	70.75%	100,932	29.25%	143,203	41.50%	345,067
Kiowa	494	59.88%	331	40.12%	163	19.76%	825
Kit Carson	2,180	61.97%	1,338	38.03%	842	23.93%	3,518
La Plata	23,136	69.55%	10,130	30.45%	13,006	39.10%	33,266
Lake	2,332	63.66%	1,331	36.34%	1,001	27.33%	3,663
Larimer	149,115	70.39%	62,731	29.61%	86,384	40.78%	211,846
Las Animas	4,367	59.87%	2,927	40.13%	1,440	19.74%	7,294
Lincoln	1,524	61.03%	973	38.97%	551	22.07%	2,497
Logan	6,004	62.18%	3,652	37.82%	2,352	24.36%	9,656
Mesa	55,998	64.01%	31,480	35.99%	24,518	28.03%	87,478
Mineral	448	63.82%	254	36.18%	194	27.64%	702
Moffat	3,710	59.36%	2,540	40.64%	1,170	18.72%	6,250
Montezuma	9,283	64.67%	5,072	35.33%	4,211	29.33%	14,355
Montrose	16,030	65.54%	8,428	34.46%	7,602	31.08%	24,458
Morgan	7,918	61.47%	4,964	38.53%	2,954	22.93%	12,882
Otero	5,249	60.99%	3,357	39.01%	1,892	21.98%	8,606
Ouray	2,739	70.34%	1,155	29.66%	1,584	40.68%	3,894
Park	8,049	69.48%	3,536	30.52%	4,513	38.96%	11,585
Phillips	1,324	60.48%	865	39.52%	459	20.97%	2,189
Pitkin	7,733	75.89%	2,457	24.11%	5,276	51.78%	10,190
Prowers	2,866	58.68%	2,018	41.32%	848	17.36%	4,884
Pueblo	46,719	57.53%	34,489	42.47%	12,230	15.06%	81,208
Rio Blanco	2,042	58.29%	1,461	41.71%	581	16.59%	3,503
Rio Grande	3,659	61.57%	2,284	38.43%	1,375	23.14%	5,943
Routt	10,644	69.21%	4,735	30.79%	5,909	38.42%	15,379
Saguache	1,956	62.53%	1,172	37.47%	784	25.06%	3,128
San Juan	370	70.48%	155	29.52%	215	40.95%	525
San Miguel	2,919	66.46%	1,473	33.54%	1,446	32.92%	4,392
Sedgwick	753	59.67%	509	40.33%	244	19.33%	1,262
Summit	11,549	70.90%	4,739	29.10%	6,810	41.81%	16,288
Teller	11,101	70.54%	4,636	29.46%	6,465	41.08%	15,737
Washington	1,582	58.81%	1,108	41.19%	474	17.62%	2,690
Weld	110,337	64.72%	60,147	35.28%	50,190	29.44%	170,484
Yuma	2,963	66.12%	1,518	33.88%	1,445	32.25%	4,481
Total	2,058,063	68.34%	953,652	31.66%	1,104,411	36.67%	3,011,715

== See also ==
- 2024 United States ballot measures
- Capital punishment in Colorado
