= 2024 Colorado Proposition 128 =

Proposition 128
- November 5, 2024
- Parole Eligibility for Crimes of Violence

Results
Choice	Votes	%
Yes	1,869,231	62.11%
No	1,140,284	37.89%
Total votes	3,009,515	100.00%
County results
For
70–80%
60–70%
50–60%
Against
50–60%

2024 Colorado Proposition 128 was a successful ballot measure that appeared before voters during the 2024 general election in Colorado. The measure requires anyone convicted of a violent felony offense to serve 85% of their sentence before being eligible for parole or any sentence reductions for good behavior.

== Background ==
Prior to the passage of Proposition 128, people convicted of violent felonies, including murder, assault, kidnapping, arson, burglary, and robbery, were required to serve a minimum of 75% of their sentence before becoming eligible for parole. Proposition 128 raised that requirement from 75% to 85%. Additionally, it bars inmates convicted of violent felonies from having their sentences reduced for good behavior until they've served at least 85% of said sentence. The proposition also requires anyone convicted of a violent felony three times to serve the full duration of their sentence.

Proposition 128 was referred to the ballot by citizen initiated petition. The petitioning and campaigning for the measure are being led by the conservative group Advance Colorado, who also backed Amendment 80 and Proposition 130. Roughly 220 people per year are convicted of a violent felony in Colorado, serving an average of 23 years in prison. As Proposition 128 is likely to increase the amount of time spent in prison for these felons, it is estimated to cost between $12 million and $28 million per year.

== Contents ==
The proposition appeared on the ballot as follows:

Shall there be a change to the Colorado Revised Statutes concerning parole eligibility for an offender convicted of certain crimes, and, in connection therewith, requiring an offender who is convicted of second degree murder; first degree assault; class 2 felony kidnapping; sexual assault; first degree arson; first degree burglary; or aggravated robbery committed on or after January 1, 2025, to serve 85 percent of the sentence imposed before being eligible for parole, and requiring an offender convicted of any such crime committed on or after January 1, 2025, who was previously convicted of any two crimes of violence, not just those crimes enumerated in this measure, to serve the full sentence imposed before beginning to serve parole?

== Campaigns ==
=== Support ===
There was no major organized campaign in favor of Proposition 128, though petitioning for the measure was led by the group Advance Colorado. The state's official voter guide also offered the arguments in favor of the measure that it would increase public safety and ensure that justice is served for victims of violent crimes.

'Yes'

Newspapers

- The Colorado Springs Gazette

Organziations

- Colorado Republican Party

=== Opposition ===
Opposition to Proposition 128 was led by the group Coloradans For Smart Justice The official Colorado voter guide also offered the argument against the measure that it removes rehabilitation opportunities for inmates and would increase prison costs without reducing crime rates.

'No'

State representatives

- Judy Amabile, state representative for the 13th district (2021-2025)
- Chad Clifford, state representative for the 37th district (2024-present)
- Javier Mabrey, state representative for the 1st district (2023-present)
- Emily Sirota, state representative for the 9th district (2019-present)
- Brianna Titone, state representative for the 27th district (2019-present)
- Mike Weissman, state representative for the 36th district (2017-2025)

Organizations

- ACLU of Colorado
- Colorado Democratic Party
- Colorado Working Families Party
- SEIU Local 105

== Results ==
Proposition 128 required a simple majority to pass. It did so with 62% of voters supporting the measure.

Proposition 128
Choice	Votes	%
For	1,869,231	62.11
Against	1,140,284	37.89
Total	3,009,515	100.00

=== Results by county ===
County	For		Against		Margin		Total votes cast
County	#	%	#	%	#	%	Total votes cast
Adams	139,792	64.53%	76,831	35.47%	62,961	29.06%	216,623
Alamosa	4,673	66.28%	2,377	33.72%	2,296	32.57%	7,050
Arapahoe	189,754	62.11%	115,754	37.89%	74,000	24.22%	305,508
Archuleta	5,725	65.26%	3,048	34.74%	2,677	30.51%	8,773
Baca	1,118	58.97%	778	41.03%	340	17.93%	1,896
Bent	1,490	71.05%	607	28.95%	883	42.11%	2,097
Boulder	85,402	46.74%	97,334	53.26%	-11,932	-6.53%	182,736
Broomfield	26,519	60.21%	17,525	39.79%	8,994	20.42%	44,044
Chaffee	7,970	58.40%	5,677	41.60%	2,293	16.80%	13,647
Cheyenne	693	68.28%	322	31.72%	371	36.55%	1,015
Clear Creek	3,449	60.27%	2,274	39.73%	1,175	20.53%	5,723
Conejos	2,419	61.69%	1,502	38.31%	917	23.39%	3,921
Costilla	1,188	62.89%	701	37.11%	487	25.78%	1,889
Crowley	1,130	68.44%	521	31.56%	609	36.89%	1,651
Custer	2,635	71.25%	1,063	28.75%	1,572	42.51%	3,698
Delta	12,682	67.81%	6,019	32.19%	6,663	35.63%	18,701
Denver	172,795	50.98%	166,137	49.02%	6,658	1.96%	338,932
Dolores	870	64.93%	470	35.07%	400	29.85%	1,340
Douglas	157,066	68.00%	73,908	32.00%	83,158	36.00%	230,974
Eagle	14,988	58.32%	10,713	41.68%	4,275	16.63%	25,701
El Paso	250,759	69.05%	112,395	30.95%	138,364	38.10%	363,154
Elbert	14,876	75.26%	4,890	24.74%	9,986	50.52%	19,766
Fremont	17,566	71.79%	6,904	28.21%	10,662	43.57%	24,470
Garfield	16,851	58.75%	11,830	41.25%	5,021	17.51%	28,681
Gilpin	2,372	60.29%	1,562	39.71%	810	20.59%	3,934
Grand	5,659	60.27%	3,731	39.73%	1,928	20.53%	9,390
Gunnison	5,490	53.72%	4,729	46.28%	761	7.45%	10,219
Hinsdale	369	64.85%	200	35.15%	169	29.70%	569
Huerfano	2,800	66.94%	1,383	33.06%	1,417	33.88%	4,183
Jackson	511	64.20%	285	35.80%	226	28.39%	796
Jefferson	207,327	60.43%	135,755	39.57%	71,572	20.86%	343,082
Kiowa	603	73.63%	216	26.37%	387	47.25%	819
Kit Carson	2,603	74.29%	901	25.71%	1,702	48.57%	3,504
La Plata	19,357	58.05%	13,986	41.95%	5,371	16.11%	33,343
Lake	2,158	58.88%	1,507	41.12%	651	17.76%	3,665
Larimer	131,042	61.64%	81,548	38.36%	49,494	23.28%	212,590
Las Animas	4,999	68.39%	2,311	31.61%	2,688	36.77%	7,310
Lincoln	1,731	69.30%	767	30.70%	964	38.59%	2,498
Logan	6,915	71.08%	2,814	28.92%	4,101	42.15%	9,729
Mesa	58,174	66.67%	29,088	33.33%	29,086	33.33%	87,262
Mineral	470	67.05%	231	32.95%	239	34.09%	701
Moffat	4,313	68.63%	1,971	31.37%	2,342	37.27%	6,284
Montezuma	9,170	64.00%	5,158	36.00%	4,012	28.00%	14,328
Montrose	16,760	68.83%	7,589	31.17%	9,171	37.66%	24,349
Morgan	9,045	69.99%	3,879	30.01%	5,166	39.97%	12,924
Otero	6,229	72.22%	2,396	27.78%	3,833	44.44%	8,625
Ouray	2,244	57.60%	1,652	42.40%	592	15.20%	3,896
Park	7,643	65.62%	4,005	34.38%	3,638	31.23%	11,648
Phillips	1,553	71.14%	630	28.86%	923	42.28%	2,183
Pitkin	5,079	50.31%	5,017	49.69%	62	0.61%	10,096
Prowers	3,346	68.37%	1,548	31.63%	1,798	36.74%	4,894
Pueblo	56,454	69.50%	24,778	30.50%	31,676	38.99%	81,232
Rio Blanco	2,326	66.53%	1,170	33.47%	1,156	33.07%	3,496
Rio Grande	4,064	68.23%	1,892	31.77%	2,172	36.47%	5,956
Routt	8,642	56.30%	6,707	43.70%	1,935	12.61%	15,349
Saguache	1,887	60.29%	1,243	39.71%	644	20.58%	3,130
San Juan	300	57.03%	226	42.97%	74	14.07%	526
San Miguel	2,285	52.15%	2,097	47.85%	188	4.29%	4,382
Sedgwick	833	66.75%	415	33.25%	418	33.49%	1,248
Summit	8,963	55.35%	7,230	44.65%	1,733	10.70%	16,193
Teller	11,643	73.97%	4,098	26.03%	7,545	47.93%	15,741
Washington	1,871	69.58%	818	30.42%	1,053	39.16%	2,689
Weld	116,339	68.32%	53,949	31.68%	62,390	36.64%	170,288
Yuma	3,252	72.69%	1,222	27.31%	2,030	45.37%	4,474
Total	1,869,231	62.11%	1,140,284	37.89%	728,947	24.22%	3,009,515

== See also ==
- 2024 United States ballot measures
