= 2024 Missouri Proposition A =

2024 Missouri ballot measure on minimum wage and paid sick leave

Proposition A
- November 5, 2024
- Minimum Wage and Earned Paid Sick Time Initiative

Results
| Choice | Votes | % |
|---|---|---|
| Yes | 1,693,064 | 57.57% |
| No | 1,247,658 | 42.43% |
| Valid votes | 2,940,722 | 100.00% |
| Invalid or blank votes | 0 | 0.00% |
| Total votes | 2,940,722 | 100.00% |

Yes
90–100%
80–90%
70–80%
60–70%
50–60%
No
90–100%
80–90%
70–80%
60–70%
50–60%
Other
Tie
No votes
Election Results (Missouri Secretary of State)

Proposition A was a 2024 Missouri ballot measure to increase the minimum wage to $15 in 2026 and then adjust for inflation annually beginning in January 2027 and require employers to provide expanded paid sick leave.

== Background ==
In 2018, voters approved Proposition B to raise the minimum wage to $12 in 2023.

== Ballot language ==
Official Ballot Title:

Do you want to amend Missouri law to:

- increase minimum wage January 1, 2025 to $13.75 per hour, increasing $1.25 per hour each year until 2026, when the minimum wage would be $15.00 per hour;
- adjust minimum wage based on changes in the Consumer Price Index each January beginning in 2027;
- require all employers to provide one hour of paid sick leave for every thirty hours worked;
- allow the Department of Labor and Industrial Relations to provide oversight and enforcement; and
- exempt governmental entities, political subdivisions, school districts and education institutions?

State governmental entities estimate onetime costs of $660,000, ongoing annual costs of at least $5.2 million, and initial license fee revenue of $11.75 million. Because the proposal allows for deductions against sports gaming revenues, they estimate unknown tax revenue ranging from $0 to $28.9 million annually. Local governments estimate unknown revenue.

Fair Ballot Language:

A “yes” vote will amend Missouri statutes to increase the state minimum wage beginning January 1, 2025 to $13.75 per hour and increase the hourly rate $1.25, to $15.00 per hour beginning January 2026. Annually the minimum wage will be adjusted based on the Consumer Price Index. The law will require employers with fifteen or more employees to provide one hour of paid sick leave for every thirty hours worked. The amendment will exempt governmental entities, political subdivisions, school districts and education institutions from the minimum wage increase.

A “no” vote will not amend Missouri law to make changes to the state minimum wage law.

If passed, this measure will have no impact on taxes.

== Reactions ==
=== Lawsuit ===
Associated Industries of Missouri, the Missouri Chamber of Commerce and Industry, the Missouri Grocers Association, the Missouri Restaurant Association, the National Federation of Independent Business filed a lawsuit. The Supreme Court of Missouri upheld proposition A.

=== Partial repeal ===
Assembly members Sherri Gallick and Mike Bernskoetter sponsored HB 567 which repealed the Consumer Price Index adjustment and extend the wage requirement to public employers. The bill also repealed the sick leave mandate. In July 2025, Governor Mike Kehoe signed the bill into law. HB 567 is part of efforts by Republicans across the United States to limit the power of ballot measures. In Missouri, the Republican trifecta worked to reverse not just Proposition A but also Amendment 3. In Alaska and Nebraska lawmakers engaged in similar efforts over other sick leave measures.
