= Initiative 83 =

2024 Washington, D.C., ballot measure

- November 5, 2024
- Ranked Choice Voting and Open the Primary Elections to Independent Voters Act of 2024

Results
Choice	Votes	%
Yes	212,332	72.89%
No	78,961	27.11%
Valid votes	291,293	88.79%
Invalid or blank votes	36,778	11.21%
Total votes	328,071	100.00%

Yes
80–90%
70–80%
60–70%
50–60%

Initiative 83 was a voter-approved ballot initiative in Washington, D.C., that would permit ranked-choice voting and open the primary elections to independent voters. It allows voters registered as “unaffiliated” to participate in primaries, which were closed to these voters prior to the passage of the initiative. As of October 2024, D.C. had more than 80,000 unaffiliated voters. The initiative was passed with 73% of the vote.

== History ==
The initiative was officially proposed as the Make All Votes Count Act of 2024 by Lisa D.T. Rice and Philip Pannell, longtime activists and leaders of the Make All Votes Count D.C. campaign in May 2023. On July 21, 2023, the ballot initiative was deemed "proper subject matter" by the District of Columbia Board of Elections. On August 23, the DC Board of Elections held its public hearing on the formulation of the short title, summary statement, legislative text. At this hearing, the ballot initiative's short title was changed to Ranked Choice Voting and Open the Primary Elections to Independent Voters Act of 2024. On September 1, 2023, the final version of the short title, summary statement, and legislative text was published in the DC register, which triggered a 10-day challenge period, where a DC voter could challenge the initiative. No challenge was timely filed. On September 13, 2023, the DC Board of Elections accepted a request for an abeyance to delay the adoption of the Initiative 83 petition until January 2024. On January 10, 2024, the proposer adopted the official Initiative 83 petition for ballot access.

== Lawsuits ==
On August 1, 2023, the DC Democratic Party and its chairman, Charles E. Wilson, sued D.C. Mayor Muriel Bowser, the DC Board of Elections, and the Government of the District of Columbia believing they erred when Initiative 83 was determined to be “proper subject matter,” and they asked the court to permanently block the initiative from being implemented. The lawsuit caused numerous complaints within the party. The lawsuit was ultimately withdrawn on November 4, 2023.

On August 31, 2023, a similar lawsuit was filed by the DC Democratic Party, chairman Wilson, and former independent, at-large candidate for the D.C. City Council Keith Silver, which sought to challenge the initiative upon similar grounds as the previous lawsuit. However, the challenge was filed one day too early and was ultimately dismissed by the judge overseeing the failed earlier lawsuit.

== Creation ==
On July 14, 2021, D.C. Councilmember Christina Henderson introduced the Voter Ownership, Integrity, Choice, and Equity (VOICE) Amendment Act of 2021, which would have implemented ranked-choice voting in Washington, DC. Co-introduced with a majority of D.C. Councilmembers, the bill had a hearing on November 18, 2021, where a stream of members of the D.C. Democratic State Committee testified against it. The bill ultimately did not receive a vote and died in committee.

Only 10 states have closed primary elections like the District of Columbia. Because 76% of the voters are registered Democrats, the winner of the November general election in most contests is decided in the Democratic primary in June. Independent voters are functionally disenfranchised by not being allowed to participate in the primary that chooses the Democratic Party's mayoral candidate and other important races. The campaign believes this amounts to voter suppression. Initiative 83 will allow these voters to participate in the primary election without being required to join a political party. The initiative does not permit current members of political parties to vote in a different party's primary election.

The District of Columbia Home Rule Act requires elections to be conducted on a partisan basis and prohibits political parties from nominating more than one candidate to the general election. Therefore, the proposers of Initiative 83 were unable to propose a top-four primary or a final-five voting form of ranked-choice voting.

== Petition gathering ==
The campaign had until July 8, 2024, to collect the names, addresses, and signatures of 5% of the registered voters in Washington, DC, including 5% of the voters in 5 of the 8 wards. Based on the April 30, 2024, voter registration statistics, the campaign needed the signatures from 22,538 DC voters to achieve ballot access for the 2024 general election ballot. The campaign issued a press release on March 22, 2024, stating they had collected 10,000 signatures from DC voters and were 1/3 from their goal of 30,000 signatures. On July 1, the campaign submitted 40,000 signatures to the D.C. Board of Elections. The petition survived a challenge period, which was from July 4 to 13.

Ref
Ward	Signatures of Registered Voters Required	Total Signatures Used to be Utilized for Random Sampling	Surplus Signatures	Number of Valid Signatures in Sample of 100	Decision with 95% Confidence
1	2,739	4,274	1,535	99	Accept
2	2,464	2,774	310	97	Accept
3	2,673	3,303	630	99	Accept
4	2,878	4,076	1,198	94	Accept
5	3,243	3,607	364	93	No Decision
6	3,092	3,995	903	100	Accept
7	2,815	3,250	435	98	Accept
8	2,635	2,494	-141	99	Reject
Citywide	22,538	27,773	5,235		Accept

In total, the DCBOE found 27,773 signatures to be valid, the campaign passed the 5% validity threshold in 6 of the 8 wards, and the initiative was placed on the November general election ballot.

== Political arguments ==
=== For ===
- In crowded elections with numerous candidates running for the same office, ranked choice voting ensures the winning candidate is elected with over 50% of the vote
- Independents should be able to participate in all taxpayer-funded elections
- In order to secure a voter's second choice, candidates are less likely to engage in negative campaigning

=== Against ===
- The District of Columbia should keep its primaries closed and only allow members of political parties to participate
- Ranked choice voting and opening the primary elections to independent voters should not have been combined into one ballot initiative
- Mayor Muriel Bowser said ranked choice voting is "a very complicated election system"

== Results ==
Initiative 83
Choice	Votes	%
For	212,332	72.89
Against	78,961	27.11
Total	291,293	100.00
Valid votes	291,293	89.33
Invalid/blank votes	34,788	10.67
Total votes	326,081	100.00
Registered voters/turnout	326,129	99.99
Source: District of Columbia Board of Elections

== Implementation ==
Although the initiative passed overwhelmingly, the Council ultimately had a pocket veto power over its implementation by withholding funding. On July 14, 2025, the Council voted 8-4 to approve funding for ranked-choice voting but declined to fund open primaries in the 2026 elections.

Writing in Washington Socialist, Kurtis H. and Patrick Dalton argue that the initiative would disenfranchise Democratic voters in at-large council seat elections. Voters previously cast two votes and the top two candidates— typically the Democratic nominee and a Democrat-aligned independent— would be elected. Under the new system, ballots for the first-place finisher, likely the Democrat, would not count toward the second-place candidate, effectively discarding the majority of voters’ second choices. This may reduce Democratic voters’ influence and could allow a Republican candidate to win, which has not happened since Carol Schwartz last won re-election in 2004.

== See also ==
- 2024 United States ballot measures
- Ranked-choice voting in the United States
