= November 2024 Alabama Amendment 1 =

- November 5, 2024
- Allow Franklin County Board of Education to Manage, Sell, or Lease Land in the Franklin County School System Amendment

Results
Choice	Votes	%
Yes	1,159,794	74.37%
No	399,640	25.63%
Valid votes	1,559,434	100.00%
Invalid or blank votes	0	0.00%
Total votes	1,559,434	100.00%

Yes
90–100%
80–90%
70–80%
60–70%
50–60%
No
80–90%
70–80%
60–70%
50–60%
Other
Tie
No votes

Alabama Amendment 1 is a legislatively referred constitutional amendment that appeared on the ballot in the US state of Alabama on November 5, 2024, concurrent with the 2024 United States elections. When passed, the amendment allowed the Franklin County Board of Education to manage, sell, or lease land in the Franklin County school system.

== Text ==
Proposing an amendment to the Constitution of Alabama of 2022, to grant certain sixteenth section and indemnity school land that is owned in fee simple by the Franklin County school system, is located in Fayette County and Walker County, and is for the exclusive use of schools in the Franklin County School System to the Franklin County Board of Education; and to provide for the distribution of any proceeds and interest generated by this land to the Franklin County Board of Education. (Proposed by Act 2024-301)

== Background ==
Franklin County Schools owns land that is described as Sixteenth Section land due to being located between Highway 13 and Interstate 22, which means that only the Alabama Department of Conservation is able to manage, lease, or sell this land. This amendment would allow Franklin County Schools to sell, lease, and control the land, along with timber, minerals, or natural resources. It will be a statewide amendment due to the affected land falling in multiple county lines. The two other counties that it falls in are Fayette County and Walker County.

The Alabama Fair Ballot Commission agreed to the language of the amendment on the ballot on June 20.

The legislation was supported by State Representative Jamie Kiel.

=== Legislative voting ===
The amendment was approved by the Alabama House of Representatives on April 9, 2024, with 72 in favor, 0 in opposition, and 31 abstentions. It was then approved by the Alabama Senate on May 8, 2024, with 35 in favor, 0 in opposition, and 0 abstentions.

== Endorsements ==
Yes

Statewide representatives

- Jamie Kiel, state representative from the 18th district (2018–present)

== Results ==
Alabama Amendment 1
Choice	Votes	%
For	1,159,794	74.37
Against	399,640	25.63
Total	1,559,434	100.00
Registered voters/turnout	3,868,043	40.32
Source: Alabama Secretary of State

== See also ==
- 2024 United States ballot measures
