= 2024 Washington Initiative 2124 =

Proposal to make employee participation in state long-term care program voluntary

Initiative 2124
- November 5, 2024
- This measure would provide that employees and self-employed people must elect to keep coverage under RCW 50B.04 and could opt-out any time. It would also repeal a law governing an exemption for employees.

Results
Choice	Votes	%
Yes	1,668,435	44.54%
No	2,077,216	55.46%
Valid votes	3,745,651	100.00%
Invalid or blank votes	0	0.00%
Total votes	3,745,651	100.00%

Yes
90–100%
80–90%
70–80%
60–70%
50–60%
No
90–100%
80–90%
70–80%
60–70%
50–60%
Other
Tie
No votes

Initiative No. 2124 (I-2124) was a ballot initiative in the US State of Washington that appeared on the November 5, 2024 ballot. The initiative, if passed, would have made participation in Washington's state-run long term health insurance program (WA Cares) voluntary rather than mandatory. The initiative was one of six brought to the state legislature by Let's Go Washington, a Redmond-based political action committee founded by businessman and hedge fund manager Brian Heywood.

== Background ==
The program known as WA Cares has its roots in the Long-Term Services and Supports Trust Act (Trust Act), which the Washington state legislature passed in 2019. WA Cares is a program is a first-in-the-nation program that provides coverage for long term care costs for Washingtonians, though with a lifetime maximum benefit that started at $36,500 (and whose cap was indexed to inflation). Under the Trust Act, all workers in the state would be required to contribute to the program unless they had acquired private long term care insurance by 2021. Workers pay a 0.58% tax on their income (which began in July 2023) and become eligible for the benefits in July of 2026.

WA Cares became one of six issues selected by the Let's Go Washington PAC in 2023 to be included in an initiative petition campaign. The argument made by the organization was that the existing benefit was inadequate to meet citizen needs and that the benefits were not portable. A total of 2.6 million signatures were collected across the 6 issues, including the WA Cares repeal effort, which cleared 324,516 signature threshold required for issue consideration for the 2024 election cycle. I-2124 was the last of the six initiatives to be submitted for consideration. I-2124 was certified by the Secretary of State on January 23, 2024, and introduced to the state legislature on January 29, 2024. In February of 2024, Democratic legislative leaders ruled out any movement on I-2124 in the legislature itself, putting the initiative on track for consideration by the public during the 2024 general election.

== Language and impact ==
I-2117 placed the following question before the citizens of Washington:

Initiative Measure No. 2124 concerns state long term care insurance.

This measure would provide that employees and self-employed people must elect to keep coverage under RCW 50B.04 and could opt-out any time. It would also repeal a law governing an exemption for employees.

Should this measure be enacted into law? Yes [ ] No [ ]

If passed, I-2124 would have created an opt-out option which would repeal the payroll tax for those opting out but also make them ineligible for the benefit. However, the decrease in payroll tax revenues could create what some insurers call a "death spiral", causing the program to become insolvent within a few years of beginning to pay out benefits.

== Support for I-2124 ==
As of October 31, 2024, Let's Go Washington and the Taxpayers Accountability Alliance are registered as sponsors of the initiative.

== Opposition to I-2124 ==
As of October 31, 2024, the 45th district Democratic Party, the AARP No on I-2124 Committee, Defend Washington, Fuse Voters, the No on 2124 PAC, Protect Washington, the SEIU 775 Ballot Fund, and the Stop Greed PAC are registered as opponents of the initiative.

== Public opinion on I-2124 ==
Poll	Sponsor	Dates	Margin of Error	Mode	Sample Size	Support	Oppose	Undecided
SurveyUSA	Seattle Times, KING-TV, & UW Center for an Informed Public	Oct 9–14, 2024	± 5%	Online	703 LV	28%	49%	23%
Elway	Cascade PBS	Oct 8–12, 2024	± 5%	Live Phone & Text	401 LV	45%	33%	22%
Elway	Cascade PBS	Sep 3–6, 2024	± 5%	Live Phone & Text	403 RV	39%	33%	27%
SurveyUSA	Seattle Times, KING-TV, & UW Center for an Informed Public	July 10–13, 2024	± 5%	Online	708 LV	52%	27%	22%
Scott Rasmussen National Survey		May 20–23, 2024	± 3.5%		800 RV	58%	29%	14%
Elway	Cascade PBS	May 13–16, 2024	± 5%	Live Phone & Text	403 RV	47%	25%	28%
GBAO Strategies	Defend Washington	April 11–14, 2024	± 4%	Live Phone & Text	600 LV	41%	49%	10%

== Results ==
I-2124 failed with fewer than 45% of ballots cast in favor.

2024 Washington Initiative 2124
Choice	Votes	%
For	1,668,435	44.54
Against	2,077,216	55.46
Total	3,745,651	100.00
Source: Washington Secretary of State

=== By county ===
County results
County	No		Yes		Margin		Total votes
County	#	%	#	%	#	%	Total votes
Adams	2,317	44.68%	2,869	55.32%	-552	-10.64%	5,186
Asotin	5,704	52.14%	5,235	47.86%	469	4.29%	10,939
Benton	43,254	44.85%	53,195	55.15%	-9,941	-10.31%	96,449
Chelan	19,862	49.22%	20,492	50.78%	-630	-1.56%	40,354
Clallam	26,750	58.23%	19,188	41.77%	7,562	16.46%	45,938
Clark	138,521	53.56%	120,115	46.44%	18,406	7.12%	258,636
Columbia	1,033	43.15%	1,361	56.85%	-328	-13.70%	2,394
Cowlitz	27,946	49.82%	28,150	50.18%	-204	-0.36%	56,096
Douglas	9,161	45.15%	11,127	54.85%	-1,966	-9.69%	20,288
Ferry	1,918	49.00%	1,996	51.00%	-78	-1.99%	3,914
Franklin	13,041	43.90%	16,667	56.10%	-3,626	-12.21%	29,708
Garfield	548	41.67%	767	58.33%	-219	-16.65%	1,315
Grant	15,370	44.46%	19,199	55.54%	-3,829	-11.08%	34,569
Grays Harbor	19,845	54.61%	16,496	45.39%	3,349	9.22%	36,341
Island	28,440	57.19%	21,288	42.81%	7,152	14.38%	49,728
Jefferson	17,069	71.47%	6,815	28.53%	10,254	42.93%	23,884
King	664,295	61.25%	420,319	38.75%	243,976	22.49%	1,084,614
Kitsap	86,261	57.22%	64,490	42.78%	21,771	14.44%	150,751
Kittitas	11,834	46.73%	13,490	53.27%	-1,656	-6.54%	25,324
Klickitat	6,825	53.11%	6,025	46.89%	800	6.23%	12,850
Lewis	19,267	44.20%	24,324	55.80%	-5,057	-11.60%	43,591
Lincoln	2,636	38.43%	4,224	61.57%	-1,588	-23.15%	6,860
Mason	18,831	53.28%	16,511	46.72%	2,320	6.56%	35,342
Okanogan	10,733	53.88%	9,187	46.12%	1,546	7.76%	19,920
Pacific	8,081	59.86%	5,419	40.14%	2,662	19.72%	13,500
Pend Oreille	3,794	46.59%	4,350	53.41%	-556	-6.83%	8,144
Pierce	217,759	52.38%	197,968	47.62%	19,791	4.76%	415,727
San Juan	8,661	70.77%	3,578	29.23%	5,083	41.53%	12,239
Skagit	35,566	53.16%	31,335	46.84%	4,231	6.32%	66,901
Skamania	3,554	51.37%	3,365	48.63%	189	2.73%	6,919
Snohomish	211,489	53.08%	186,948	46.92%	24,541	6.16%	398,437
Spokane	142,838	51.74%	133,249	48.26%	9,589	3.47%	276,087
Stevens	11,066	40.81%	16,053	59.19%	-4,987	-18.39%	27,119
Thurston	92,426	58.43%	65,757	41.57%	26,669	16.86%	158,183
Wahkiakum	1,553	54.41%	1,301	45.59%	252	8.83%	2,854
Walla Walla	15,175	53.52%	13,181	46.48%	1,994	7.03%	28,356
Whatcom	80,330	60.84%	51,712	39.16%	28,618	21.67%	132,042
Whitman	10,756	55.86%	8,500	44.14%	2,256	11.72%	19,256
Yakima	42,707	50.31%	42,189	49.69%	518	0.61%	84,896
Totals	2,077,216	55.46%	1,668,435	44.54%	408,781	10.91%	3,745,651
