= 2024 Oklahoma State Question 834 =

Referendum requiring citizenship to vote

- November 5, 2024
- Oklahoma Citizenship Requirement for Voting Amendment

Results
Choice	Votes	%
Yes	1,207,520	80.73%
No	288,267	19.27%
County results
Yes
<90%
80–90%
70–80%

2024 Oklahoma State Question 834 was a proposed amendment to the Constitution of Oklahoma to provide that only citizens of the United States are eligible to vote. The amendment, which coincided with the 2024 Oklahoma elections, was approved with 80.73% of the vote and the support of all 77 counties in Oklahoma.

== Background ==
Senate Joint Resolution (SJR) 23 placed the measure on the ballot. On May 30, 2024, the Oklahoma Senate passed the resolution in a 37 to 7 vote, and the Oklahoma House of Representatives approved it the same day in a 71 to 11 vote.

== Contents ==
The following question and information was shown to voters:

STATE QUESTION NO. 834

LEGISLATIVE REFERENDUM NO. 377

This measure amends Section 1 of Article 3 of the Oklahoma Constitution. It clarifies that only citizens of the United States are qualified to vote in this state.

SHALL THE PROPOSAL BE APPROVED?

[] FOR THE PROPOSAL - YES

[] AGAINST THE PROPOSAL - NO

== Viewpoints ==
=== Legislators ===
State Senator Micheal Bergstrom believed the amendment would "[safeguard]" the intent of the constitutional language for the future to avoid confusion since the term 'all' is not exclusionary." He "want[ed] to make the original intent of the constitution perfectly clear."

State Senator Michael Brooks thought that "as much as some of these political stunts are there to heighten the rancor and the rhetoric, a lot of it is intended to intimidate people who are living here and living by the rules." He believed it was "a way to diffuse misinformation to a community who are welcoming and trying to make a life here."

== Results ==
The following table details the results of the amendment by county:

County	Yes		No	
County	#	%	#	%
Adair	6,013	87.42	865	12.58
Alfalfa	1,929	91.47	180	8.53
Atoka	4,796	89.29	575	10.71
Beaver	1,825	92.55	147	7.45
Beckham	6,623	89.78	754	10.22
Blaine	3,181	88.07	431	11.93
Bryan	14,129	86.82	2,145	13.18
Caddo	7,777	85.95	1,271	14.05
Canadian	58,098	83.00	11,903	17.00
Carter	16,073	86.75	2,455	13.25
Cherokee	13,853	80.84	3,283	19.16
Choctaw	4,654	89.14	567	10.86
Cimarron	795	90.44	84	9.56
Cleveland	84,617	74.15	29,495	25.85
Coal	2,036	86.82	309	13.18
Comanche	27,252	83.93	5,216	16.07
Cotton	2,133	89.02	263	10.98
Craig	4,967	85.70	829	14.30
Creek	25,799	86.16	4,144	13.84
Custer	8,379	85.46	1,426	14.54
Delaware	15,229	88.88	1,906	11.12
Dewey	1,961	90.83	198	9.17
Ellis	1,567	91.26	150	8.74
Garfield	17,806	85.33	3,060	14.67
Garvin	9,172	87.64	1,294	12.36
Grady	20,973	87.78	2,921	12.22
Grant	1,801	90.10	198	9.90
Greer	1,479	88.04	201	11.96
Harmon	723	88.49	94	11.51
Harper	1,236	90.48	130	9.52
Haskell	4,093	87.53	583	12.47
Hughes	3,762	86.58	583	13.42
Jackson	6,866	89.41	813	10.59
Jefferson	1,961	89.50	230	10.50
Johnston	3,586	89.54	419	10.46
Kay	14,034	86.20	2,246	13.80
Kingfisher	5,775	88.22	771	11.78
Kiowa	2,783	89.03	343	10.97
Latimer	3,351	87.27	489	12.73
LeFlore	15,753	89.18	1,912	10.82
Lincoln	12,939	87.35	1,874	12.65
Logan	19,431	84.03	3,692	15.97
Love	3,579	89.34	427	10.66
Major	3,060	91.32	291	8.68
Marshall	5,505	88.48	717	11.52
Mayes	14,588	87.19	2,144	12.81
McClain	18,161	87.62	2,565	12.38
McCurtain	9,370	87.85	1,296	12.15
McIntosh	6,925	86.22	1,107	13.78
Murray	4,974	88.52	645	11.48
Muskogee	19,226	82.54	4,066	17.46
Noble	4,210	87.45	604	12.55
Nowata	3,923	89.92	440	10.08
Okfuskee	3,180	84.55	581	15.45
Oklahoma	198,486	71.64	78,572	28.36
Okmulgee	11,791	85.20	2,049	14.80
Osage	16,542	84.21	3,101	15.79
Ottawa	9,245	87.26	1,350	12.74
Pawnee	5,734	86.96	860	13.04
Payne	21,927	77.89	6,224	22.11
Pittsburg	14,536	86.07	2,352	13.93
Pontotoc	12,117	83.44	2,404	16.56
Pottawatomie	23,554	85.04	4,144	14.96
Pushmataha	3,825	88.50	497	11.50
Roger Mills	1,470	89.74	168	10.26
Rogers	38,937	86.24	6,212	13.76
Seminole	6,521	85.50	1,106	14.50
Sequoyah	12,701	87.18	1,868	12.82
Stephens	15,972	89.31	1,911	10.69
Texas	4,424	87.62	625	12.38
Tillman	2,101	88.80	265	11.20
Tulsa	186,123	75.96	58,890	24.04
Wagoner	31,424	84.76	5,648	15.24
Washington	18,829	85.94	3,080	14.06
Washita	3,980	90.23	431	9.77
Woods	3,074	87.80	427	12.20
Woodward	6,296	89.34	751	10.66
State total	1,207,520	80.73	288,267	19.27

== See also ==
- Voting rights in the United States
- Non-citizen suffrage in the United States
