= Open Primaries =

American advocacy group

Open Primaries is an American 501(c)(4) and 501(c)(3) advocacy organization. Its headquarters are in New York City.

The group advocates for open primaries in the United States with a focus on the nonpartisan blanket primary. The group supported a successful ballot initiative in Colorado that created an open primary system in 2016. The group also engages in litigation against closed primary systems on behalf of unaffiliated voters.

The group also publishes research on the benefits of public, nonpartisan primaries, as well as the harmful effects of closed primaries. During the 2016 presidential primary, the group declared that closed presidential primaries cost taxpayers roughly $287.8 million to administer, and that 26.3 million voters were locked out of the primary due to their unaffiliated or independent voter status.
