= 2024 Washington Initiative 2066 =

Ballot measure repealing parts of House Bill 1589

Initiative 2066
- November 5, 2024
- Repealing Restrictions on Natural Gas

Results
Choice	Votes	%
Yes	1,941,474	51.71%
No	1,813,169	48.29%
Total votes	3,754,643	100.00%

Yes
90–100%
80–90%
70–80%
60–70%
50–60%
No
90–100%
80–90%
70–80%
60–70%
50–60%
Other
Tie
No data
- Source: Canvass of the Returns at the Wayback Machine (archived February 14, 2025)

Washington Initiative Measure No. 2066 (I-2066) was a popular referendum that was decided on November 5, 2024. The initiative was placed on the ballot by a coalition of organizations led by the Building Industry Association of Washington, a Tumwater-based non-profit organization representing an array of organizations in the homebuilding industries. The initiative was started in response to changes to the state's building codes which were intended to provide incentives for buildings to move away from natural gas as a source of heating. Initiative 2066 was approved by the voters following the November 5th, 2024 general election. Initiative 2066 was ruled unconstitutional by a 6-3 decision from the Washington State Supreme Court on September 17, 2026.

== Background ==
Washington has been pursuing a number of strategies to reduce carbon emission in the state, with a goal of reducing the state's greenhouse gas emissions by 95% by 2050. One piece of this effort was the passage of HB 1589, which was signed into law by Gov. Jay Inslee on March 28, 2024. The goal of the law was to guide large utilities (primarily targeting Puget Sound Energy) to move towards home electrification as a key component of the state's decarbonization plan. This happened along with changes to building codes that targeted gas-powered appliances and raised the costs of installing them relative to electric appliances.

In response to these changes, a coalition of groups led by the Building Industry Association of Washington, and including non-profit groups like the Washington Hospitality Association, the Washington Realtors, and Associated General Contractors as well as the libertarian-aligned political action committee Let's Go Washington, began a petition-collection campaign to put a challenge to the parts of HB 1589 that sought to limit the use of natural gas in new homes and other constructions.

Initiative 2066 was certified on July 24, 2024, having collected 533,005 signatures.

== Language and Impact ==
I-2066 placed the following question before the citizens of Washington:

Initiative Measure No.2066 concerns regulating energy services, including natural gas and electrification.

This measure would repeal or prohibit certain laws and regulations that discourage natural gas use, and/or promote electrification, and require certain utilities and local governments to provide natural gas to eligible customers.

Should this measure be enacted into law? Yes [ ] No [ ]

When passed, I-2066 would create a mandate to maintain natural gas access to all eligible households and businesses.

== Support for I-2066 ==
According to the Washington Public Disclosure Commission, Let's Go Washington was registered as sponsors of the initiative.

== Opposition to I-2066 ==
According to the Washington Public Disclosure Commission, the 45th District Democrats, Defend Washington, Fuse Voters, No on 2066, and Stop Greed were registered as opponents of the initiative.

== Public opinion on I-2066 ==
Poll	Sponsor	Dates	Margin of Error	Mode	Sample Size	Support	Oppose	Undecided
SurveyUSA	Seattle Times, KING-TV, & UW Center for an Informed Public	Oct 9–14, 2024	± 5%	Online	703 LV	44%	31%	25%
Elway	Cascade PBS	Oct 8–12, 2024	± 5%	Live Phone & Text	401 LV	51%	28%	20%
Elway	Cascade PBS	Sep 3–6, 2024	± 5%	Live Phone & Text	403 RV	47%	29%	24%
SurveyUSA	Seattle Times, KING-TV, & UW Center for an Informed Public	July 10–13, 2024	± 5%	Online	708 LV	54%	21%	25%

== Results ==
I-2066 passed with almost 52% of the vote, becoming the only one of the four initiatives on the 2024 Washington state ballot to pass.

2024 Washington Initiative 2066
Choice	Votes	%
For	1,941,474	51.71
Against	1,813,169	48.29
Total	3,754,643	100.00
Source: Washington Secretary of State

=== By county ===
County results
County	Yes		No		Margin		Total votes
County	#	%	#	%	#	%	Total votes
Adams	3,402	65.83%	1,766	34.17%	1,636	31.66%	5,168
Asotin	7,102	64.48%	3,912	35.52%	3,190	28.96%	11,014
Benton	62,431	64.15%	34,885	35.85%	27,546	28.31%	97,316
Chelan	22,178	54.89%	18,226	45.11%	3,952	9.78%	40,404
Clallam	22,583	49.14%	23,377	50.86%	-794	-1.73%	45,960
Clark	147,809	56.48%	113,873	43.52%	33,936	12.97%	261,682
Columbia	1,609	67.13%	788	32.87%	821	34.25%	2,397
Cowlitz	34,506	60.76%	22,284	39.24%	12,222	21.52%	56,790
Douglas	12,078	59.41%	8,251	40.59%	3,827	18.83%	20,329
Ferry	2,551	65.54%	1,341	34.46%	1,210	31.09%	3,892
Franklin	19,545	65.73%	10,191	34.27%	9,354	31.46%	29,736
Garfield	921	69.40%	406	30.60%	515	38.81%	1,327
Grant	21,985	63.88%	12,432	36.12%	9,553	27.76%	34,417
Grays Harbor	20,421	56.23%	15,893	43.77%	4,528	12.47%	36,314
Island	25,762	52.24%	23,553	47.76%	2,209	4.48%	49,315
Jefferson	8,638	36.10%	15,288	63.90%	-6,650	-27.79%	23,926
King	446,879	41.10%	640,376	58.90%	-193,497	-17.80%	1,087,255
Kitsap	77,087	51.38%	72,949	48.62%	4,138	2.76%	150,036
Kittitas	16,085	63.02%	9,439	36.98%	6,646	26.04%	25,524
Klickitat	7,567	59.70%	5,108	40.30%	2,459	19.40%	12,675
Lewis	28,585	65.22%	15,243	34.78%	13,342	30.44%	43,828
Lincoln	4,890	73.16%	1,794	26.84%	3,096	46.32%	6,684
Mason	20,032	56.42%	15,476	43.58%	4,556	12.83%	35,508
Okanogan	10,722	53.56%	9,298	46.44%	1,424	7.11%	20,020
Pacific	7,061	52.13%	6,483	47.87%	578	4.27%	13,544
Pend Oreille	5,274	64.18%	2,944	35.82%	2,330	28.35%	8,218
Pierce	231,471	55.75%	183,694	44.25%	47,777	11.51%	415,165
San Juan	4,534	36.93%	7,743	63.07%	-3,209	-26.14%	12,277
Skagit	38,300	56.62%	29,342	43.38%	8,958	13.24%	67,642
Skamania	4,279	61.44%	2,685	38.56%	1,594	22.89%	6,964
Snohomish	216,077	53.96%	184,359	46.04%	31,718	7.92%	400,436
Spokane	165,596	59.88%	110,951	40.12%	54,645	19.76%	276,547
Stevens	19,347	70.87%	7,951	29.13%	11,396	41.75%	27,298
Thurston	78,857	50.07%	78,639	49.93%	218	0.14%	157,496
Wahkiakum	1,731	59.10%	1,198	40.90%	533	18.20%	2,929
Walla Walla	16,422	57.71%	12,032	42.29%	4,390	15.43%	28,454
Whatcom	64,954	49.36%	66,638	50.64%	-1,684	-1.28%	131,592
Whitman	10,454	54.31%	8,796	45.69%	1,658	8.61%	19,250
Yakima	51,749	60.66%	33,565	39.34%	18,184	21.31%	85,314
Totals	1,941,474	51.71%	1,813,169	48.29%	128,305	3.42%	3,754,643

== Response to I-2066 Passage ==
Following the passage of I-2066, Governor Jay Inslee raised questions about the legality of I-2066. Environmental groups echoed this criticism, suggesting that it ran afoul of the one subject rule for initiatives in Washington state. These concerns had been raised prior to the election as well in a brief written in September by the Pacifica Law Group and professor Hugh Spitzer of the University of Washington. On December 11, 2024, a lawsuit was filed by the city of Seattle and King County along with a coalition of environmental groups. A week earlier on December 6, 2024, the Buildings Industry Association of Washington, the primary sponsor of the initiative, sued the state to compel it to begin bringing state laws into compliance with I-2066. The building industry says that their lawsuit is about creating certainty within the industry statewide, while environmental groups joining the Seattle and King County lawsuit argue that the language of I-2066 was misleading and deceptive as well as violating the single subject rule. Initiative 2066 was ruled unconstitutional by a 6-3 decision from the Washington State Supreme Court on September 17, 2026. In its decision, the court said they "hold that I-2066 violates the single- subject requirement contained in article II, section 19. Because the provisions that introduce distinct subjects are not severable, I-2066 is unconstitutional in its entirety."
