= 1999 Alabama Amendment 1 =

- October 12, 1999
- Alabama State Lottery Amendment

Results
Choice	Votes	%
Yes	568,289	45.79%
No	672,802	54.21%
Valid votes	1,241,091	100.00%
Invalid or blank votes	0	0.00%
Total votes	1,241,091	100.00%
No
70-80%
60-70%
50-60%
Yes
70-80%
60-70%
50-60%

Alabama Amendment 1 was a legislatively referred constitutional amendment that appeared on the ballot in the U.S. State of Alabama on October 12, 1999. The amendment would have established a state lottery in Alabama.

== Background ==
In 1999, Alabama was one of thirteen states without a state lottery. Governor Don Siegelman proposed this measure to the legislature, who approved and placed it onto the ballot. The bill was criticized by religious leaders as a form of gambling, which many described as a sinful act. Former Governor of Georgia Zell Miller campaigned alongside Siegelman in favor of the amendment. Pro-lottery arguments focused on keeping money in the state, as state taxes went to the national lottery, which Alabama did not benefit from.

== Results ==
The amendment was rejected with 54% in opposition.

Alabama Amendment 1
Choice	Votes	%
For	568,289	45.79
Against	672,802	54.21
Total	1,241,091	100.00
Source: Alabama Secretary of State

== Aftermath ==
In 2016, a similar bill proposed by Governor Robert J. Bentley was criticized by Siegelman, who criticized greed being the motive behind the bill. In 2022, he later criticized Poarch Creek Indians, citing the Choctaw Indians as the ones who opposed and blocked the amendment.
