= 2024 Nebraska Initiative 437 =

Initiative 437
- November 6, 2024
- Medical Cannabis Patient Protection Initiative

Results
Choice	Votes	%
Yes	637,126	71.05%
No	259,643	28.95%
Valid votes	896,769	100.00%
Invalid or blank votes	0	0.00%
Total votes	896,769	100.00%

Yes
80–90%
70–80%
60–70%
50–60%
No
60–70%
50–60%

The Medical Cannabis Patient Protection Initiative, listed on the ballot as Initiative 437 was a ballot initiative for the legalization of medical cannabis in the state of Nebraska that was passed on November 6, 2024.

== Text and impact ==
=== Text ===
Shall a statute be enacted that makes penalties inapplicable under state and local law for the use, possession, and acquisition of an allowable amount (up to five ounces) of cannabis for medical purposes by a qualified patient with a written recommendation from a health care practitioner, and for a caregiver to assist a qualified patient with these activities?

== Results ==
Initiative 437
Choice	Votes	%
For	637,126	71.05
Against	259,643	28.95
Total	896,769	100.00
Source: Secretary of State of Nebraska

== Aftermath ==
In December 2024, after a lawsuit aimed at preventing him from doing so failed, Governor Jim Pillen signed a proclamation bringing the Initiative into the state's law. Since then, the initiative has continued to be debated in court, with challengers (along with Pillen and the Attorney General) arguing that the initiative violates federal law and the Nebraska constitution.

Following the Initiative's approval by the voters and consistent with its text, the Nebraska legislature sought ways to provide a regulatory structure to support the access to and distribution of medical cannabis. There has been debate among lawmakers as to how much the government should regulate or curb access.
