= 2024 South Dakota Amendment H =

- November 5, 2024
- Top-Two Open Primary Elections Initiative

Results
Choice	Votes	%
Yes	141,570	34.39%
No	270,048	65.61%
Valid votes	411,618	100.00%
Invalid or blank votes	0	0.00%
Total votes	411,618	100.00%
Registered voters/turnout	624,186	65.94%
County results
No
80–90%
70–80%
60–70%
50–60%
Yes
50–60%

South Dakota Amendment H was a constitutional amendment that appeared on the ballot on November 5, 2024 in the US state of South Dakota. The amendment would have established a top-two or nonpartisan blanket primaries for state partisan elections. The deadline to submit signatures for constitutional referendums was May 7, with the top-two initiative being certified for the ballot on May 21. In a top-two primary, all candidates regardless of party will appear on the same primary ballot, and the top two candidates will face off in the general election. As of May 2024, five states use a top-two primary or some variation: California, Louisiana (known as a "Louisiana primary"), Nebraska, and Washington state, and, most recently, Alaska in 2020.

== Text ==
Be it enacted by the People of South Dakota:
That Article VII of the Constitution of South Dakota be amended by adding a NEW SECTION to read:

§ 4. A primary election held for the office of governor, a legislative office, a county office, the United States Senate, or the United States House of Representative shall be open to all candidates and all qualified voters without regard to the candidates' or voters' party registration or affiliation, or lack thereof.

In a primary election covered by this section, each candidate must be listed on a single primary ballot regardless of the candidate's political party. A voter may vote for any primary candidate regardless of the voter's party affiliation or lack thereof. The two candidates receiving the highest number of votes cast in a primary election advance to the general election. If more than one candidate is to be elected to an office at the general election, the number of candidates advancing from the primary election is twice the number to be elected in the general election.

The general election ballot may only include those candidates advancing from the primary election. The legislature may, by law, establish procedures for replacing a candidate who advanced from the primary election but will not participate in the general election due to death, withdrawal from the race, or disqualification.

A candidate may select the name of a political party to be listed next to the candidate's name on the primary ballot. The same political party designation shall appear next to the candidate's name on the general election ballot if the candidate advances to the general election.

Both the primary and general election ballots must state that a candidate's indicated political party designation does not constitute or imply an endorsement of the candidate by the political party designated.

The legislature may establish any necessary procedures to implement this section.

If any provision of this section or the application thereof to any person or circumstance is held invalid, such invalidity will not affect any other provision or application of the section that can be given effect without the invalid provisions or applications, and to this end the provisions of this section are severable.

== Polling ==
Poll source	Date(s) administered	Sample size	Margin of error	Yes	No	Undecided
Emerson College/Nexstar Media	October 19–22, 2024	825 (LV)	± 3.3%	40%	48%	12%
Mason-Dixon Polling & Strategy	May 10–13, 2024	500 (RV)	± 4.5%	55%	33%	12%

== See also ==
- 2024 South Dakota Amendment G
- 2024 United States ballot measures
