= March 2024 Alabama Amendment 1 =

2024 referendum

- March 4, 2024
- Exempt Local Bills from Budget Isolation Resolution Amendment

Results
Choice	Votes	%
Yes	341,515	48.69%
No	359,850	51.31%
Valid votes	701,365	100.00%
Invalid or blank votes	0	0.00%
Total votes	701,365	100.00%
County results
Yes
70–80%
60–70%
50–60%
No
60–70%
50–60%

Alabama Amendment 1 was a legislatively referred constitutional amendment that appeared on the ballot in the U.S. state of Alabama on March 4, 2024, concurrent with the 2024 United States elections. The amendment failed with 51% of voters voting against it.

== Text ==
Proposing an amendment to the Constitution of Alabama of 2022, to amend Section 71.01 authorizing the Legislature to sign and transmit local laws or constitutional amendments before the transmission of basic appropriations.

== Background ==
In Alabama, lawmakers must first pass state budgets before any other legislation can be passed. The amendment was placed on the ballot in July 2023 by the Alabama Legislature.

== Purpose ==
The amendment would have allowed members of the legislature to vote on and pass legislation related to local county or city-level issues before passing a budget.
