= 2018 California gubernatorial election =

- November 6, 2018
- Turnout: 63.28% (▲32.34 pp)
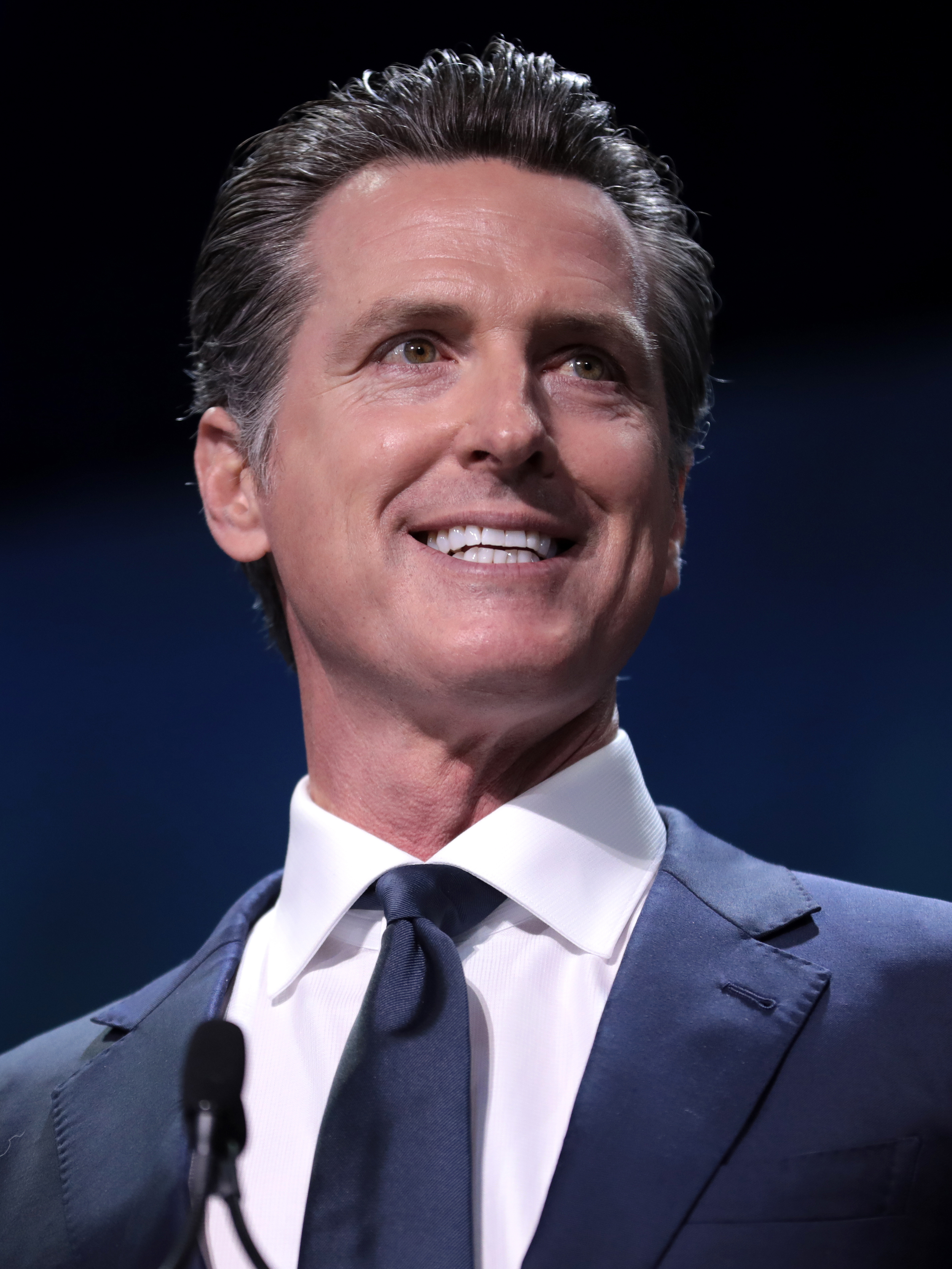

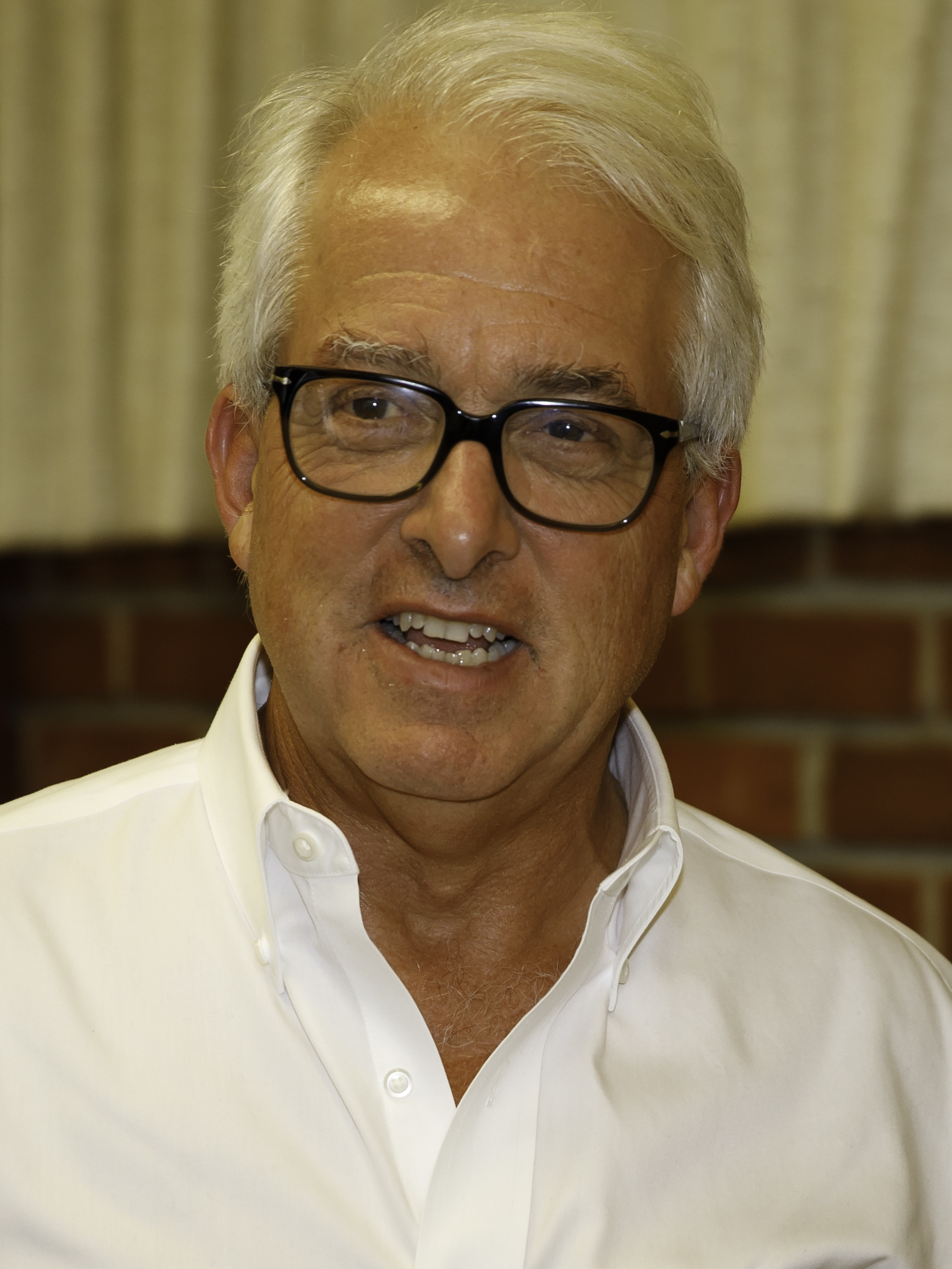
Candidate	Gavin Newsom	John H. Cox
Party	Democratic	Republican
Popular vote	7,721,410	4,742,825
Percentage	61.95%	38.05%
- Newsom: 50–60% 60–70% 70–80% 80–90% >90% Cox: 50–60% 60–70% 70–80%
Governor before election
Jerry Brown
Democratic
Elected Governor
Gavin Newsom
Democratic

The 2018 California gubernatorial election was held on November 6, 2018, to elect the governor of California, concurrently with elections for the rest of California's executive branch, as well as elections to the United States Senate and elections to the United States House of Representatives and various state and local elections. Incumbent Democratic Governor Jerry Brown was ineligible to run for a third consecutive term due to term limits. The race was between the incumbent Democratic Lieutenant Governor Gavin Newsom and businessman John H. Cox, a Republican, who qualified for the general election after placing first and second in the June 5, 2018 primary election.

Newsom won in a landslide, with 62% of the vote, the biggest victory in a gubernatorial race in California since Earl Warren won re-election in 1950, and the biggest victory for a non-incumbent since 1930. The election also marked the first time in 40 years since Orange County had voted for the Democratic candidate since Jerry Brown won it in 1978, and the first time Democrats won three consecutive gubernatorial elections in the state's history. Newsom was sworn in on January 7, 2019.

== Candidates ==
A primary election was held on June 5, 2018. Under California's non-partisan blanket primary law, all candidates appeared on the same ballot, regardless of party. Voters may vote for any candidate, regardless of their party affiliation. The top two finishers – regardless of party – advance to the general election in November, regardless of whether a candidate manages to receive a majority of the votes cast in the primary election.

=== Democratic Party ===
==== Declared ====
- Akinyemi Agbede, mathematician
- Juan M. Bribiesca, retired physician
- Thomas Jefferson Cares, blockchain start-up CEO
- John Chiang, California State Treasurer
- Delaine Eastin, former California State Superintendent of Public Instruction
- Robert Davidson Griffis, 2016 Libertarian candidate for president
- Albert Caesar Mezzetti, former Manteca city councilman
- Gavin Newsom, lieutenant governor of California
- Amanda Renteria, national political director for Hillary Clinton's 2016 presidential campaign and candidate for CA-21 in 2014
- Michael Shellenberger, founder of the Breakthrough Institute
- Klement Tinaj, actor, martial artist, stuntman, and producer
- Antonio Villaraigosa, former mayor of Los Angeles

==== Declined ====
- Xavier Becerra, Attorney General of California (ran for re-election)
- Scooter Braun, music manager
- George Clooney, actor and activist
- Kevin de León, president pro tempore of the California State Senate (ran for the U.S. Senate)
- Eric Garcetti, mayor of Los Angeles
- Bob Iger, CEO of The Walt Disney Company
- Sheryl Sandberg, Facebook COO
- Libby Schaaf, mayor of Oakland (ran for re-election)
- Jackie Speier, U.S. representative (ran for re-election)
- Tom Steyer, hedge fund manager, philanthropist, and environmentalist

=== Republican Party ===
==== Declared ====
- Travis Allen, state assemblyman
- John H. Cox, businessman
- Yvonne Girard, US military veteran
- Peter Y. Liu, entrepreneur, real estate agent, US Army veteran
- Robert C. Newman II, businessman, psychologist, farmer
- K. Pearce (write-in)

==== Withdrawn ====
- Rosey Grier, minister and retired NFL player
- David Hadley, former state assemblyman
- Allen Ishida, former Tulare County Supervisor
- Doug Ose, former U.S. representative

==== Declined ====
- Tim Donnelly, former state assemblyman, candidate for governor in 2014, and candidate for CA-08 in 2016 (running for CA-08)
- Kevin Faulconer, mayor of San Diego
- Ashley Swearengin, former mayor of Fresno
- Peter Thiel, venture capitalist

=== Peace and Freedom Party ===
==== Declared ====
- Gloria La Riva, activist and nominee for president of the United States in 2016

=== Green Party ===
==== Declared ====
- Christopher Carlson, puppeteer
- Veronika Fimbres (write-in)
- Josh Jones, author, geologist, solar electric designer

=== Libertarian Party ===
==== Declared ====
- Zoltan Istvan, Transhumanist Party nominee for President of the United States in 2016
- Nickolas Wildstar, political activist, rapper, and write-in candidate for governor in 2014

=== Independent (no party) ===
==== Declared ====
- Armando M. Arreola (write-in)
- Shubham Goel (later a contestant on Netflix's The Circle)
- Hakan "Hawk" Mikado
- Desmond Silveira, engineer and former national committee member of the American Solidarity Party (Note: American Solidarity Party does not have ballot access. Desmond Silveira (ASP) appears on ballot as "No party preference".)
- Arman Soltani (write-in)
- Jeffrey Edward Taylor
- Peter Crawford Valentino (write-in)
- Johnny Wattenburg

== Primary election ==
From the latter half of 2017, Lieutenant Governor Gavin Newsom was widely seen as the favored front runner for the top two primary. Businessman John Cox and Los Angeles Mayor Antonio Villaraigosa had both been running closely behind Newsom to obtain the second place spot. However, in late 2017, as more prominent Democrats entered the race, Villaraigosa saw his polling numbers slip out of competition with Cox. This mainly left the race between Newsom and Cox, with a third place free-for-all between Allen and Villaraigosa.

=== Endorsements ===
Travis Allen (R)

U.S. representatives

- Tom McClintock, U.S. representative (R-CA-4)
- Dana Rohrabacher, U.S. representative (R-CA-48)
- Ed Royce, U.S. representative (R-CA-39)

State-level officials

- Patricia Bates, California Senate minority leader (R-36)
- Bill Brough, California state assemblyman (R-73)
- Phillip Chen, California state assemblyman (R-55)
- Steven Choi, California state assemblyman (R-68)
- James Gallagher, California state assemblyman (R-3)
- Diane Harkey, member of the California State Board of Equalization
- Matthew Harper, California state assemblyman (R-74)
- Tom Lackey, California state assemblyman (R-36)
- Melissa Melendez, California state assemblywoman (R-67)
- Mike Morrell, California state senator (R-23)
- Jay Obernolte, California state assemblyman (R-33)
- Jim Patterson, California state assemblyman (R-23)
- Jeff Stone, California state senator (R-28)
- Randy Voepel, California state assemblyman (R-71)

Individuals

- Roger Stone, political consultant as well as strategist and InfoWars contributor

Newspapers and other media

- Santa Barbara News-Press

Organizations

- California Republican Assembly
John Chiang (D)

Federal elected officials

- Alan Lowenthal, U.S. representative (D-CA-47)
- Grace Napolitano, U.S. representative (D-CA-32)
- Linda Sánchez, U.S. representative (D-CA-38)
- Brad Sherman, U.S. representative (D-CA-30)
- Mark Takano, U.S. representative (D-CA-41), co-chair of the Congressional LGBT Equality Caucus

State-level officials

- Ed Chau, California state assemblymember (D-49)
- Lorena Gonzlez Fletcher, California state assemblymember (D-80)
- Dave Jones, California Insurance Commissioner
- Anthony Portantino, California state senator (D-25)
- Sharon Quirk-Silva, California state assemblymember (D-65)
- Anthony Rendon, Speaker of the California State Assembly (D-63)
- Bob Wieckowski, California state senator (D-10)
- Mariko Yamada, former California state assemblymember (D-4)

Local-level officials

- Bob Blumenfield, member of the Los Angeles City Council, District 3
- Rick Bonilla, San Mateo Mayor
- Ron Galperin, City Controller of Los Angeles
- Georgette Gomez, member of San Diego City Council
- José Huizar, member of the Los Angeles City Council, District 14
- Paul Koretz, member of the Los Angeles City Council, District 5
- Das Williams, member of Santa Barbara County Board of Supervisors
- Norman Yee, member of San Francisco Board of Supervisors

Organizations

- AFSCME District Council 36
- American Federation of Teachers Staff Guild, Local 1521A
- Association of California State Supervisors (ACSS)
- Council on American-Islamic Relations California PAC
- International Union of Operating Engineers State Unit 12

Individuals

- Francine Busby, former chair of the San Diego County Democratic Party
Delaine Eastin (D)

State-level officials

- Cecilia Aguiar-Curry, California state assemblywoman (D-04)
- Dede Alpert, former California state senator (D-39)
- Tom Ammiano, former California state assemblymember (D-17)
- Joan Buchanan, former California state assemblywoman (D-16)
- Laura Chick, former California inspector general, Los Angeles controller, Los Angeles city councilmember
- Loni Hancock, former California state senator (D-09)
- Leona Egeland Rice, former California state assemblywoman (Santa Clara)
- Lori Saldana, former California state assemblywoman (D-76)
- Virginia Strom-Martin, former California state assemblywoman (D-01)
- Sally Tanner, former California state assemblywoman (D-60)
- Tom Torlakson, State Superintendent of Public Instruction

Local-level officials

- Harry Britt, former San Francisco supervisor
- Heather Fargo, former mayor of Sacramento
- Gus Morrison, former mayor of Fremont
- Joy Picus, former Los Angeles city councilmember

Organizations

- Cal Berkeley Democrats
- Feel the Bern Democratic Club, Los Angeles
- Feminist Majority Foundation
- Harvey Milk LGBT Democratic Club
- National Women's Political Caucus of California
- Our Revolution Ventura County
Josh Jones (G)

Individuals

- Viggo Mortensen, actor
Desmond Silveira (ASP)

Individuals

- Dr. Ronda Chervin, Ph.D, emerita professor of philosophy, author of numerous books, TV and radio presenter
- Mike Maturen, 2016 presidential candidate of American Solidarity Party
- Joe Schriner, journalist, activist, and six-time independent presidential candidate

Organizations

- American Solidarity Party
Antonio Villaraigosa (D)

U.S. representatives

- Karen Bass, U.S. representative (D-CA-37)
- Tony Coelho, former U.S. representative
- Lou Correa, U.S. representative (D-CA-46)
- Lucille Roybal-Allard, U.S. representative (D-CA-40)
- Diane Watson, former U.S. representative

State-level officials

- Steven Bradford, California state senator (D-35)
- Ian Calderon, California state assemblymember (D-57), majority leader of the California Assembly
- Eduardo Garcia, California state assemblymember (D-56)
- Ben Hueso, California state senator (D-40)
- Kevin Murray, former California state senator
- Fabian Núñez, former speaker of the California State Assembly
- John Pérez, former speaker of the California State Assembly
- Cruz Reynoso, former California Supreme Court Justice
- Freddie Rodriguez, California state assemblymember (D-52)
- Blanca Rubio, California state assemblymember (D-48)
- Shirley Weber, California state assemblymember (D-79)

Local-level officials

- Art Agnos, former mayor of San Francisco
- Luis Alejo, member of the Monterey County Board of Supervisors
- Aja Brown, Mayor of Compton
- David Campos, former supervisor, City of San Francisco
- Marqueece Harris-Dawson, member of the Los Angeles City Council
- Sheila Kuehl, member of the Los Angeles County Board of Supervisors
- Sam Liccardo, mayor of San Jose
- Manuel Lozano, mayor of Baldwin Park
- Gloria Molina, former member of the Los Angeles County Board of Supervisors
- V. Manuel Perez, member of the Riverside County Board of Supervisors
- Aaron Peskin, Supervisor, City of San Francisco
- Curren Price, member of the Los Angeles City Council
- Simon Salinas, member of the Monterey County Board of Supervisors
- Herb Wesson, president of the Los Angeles City Council

Organizations

- International Union of Painters and Allied Trades District Council 36
- United Farm Workers

Individuals

- Meg Whitman, CEO of Hewlett Packard Enterprise, former CEO of eBay and 2010 Republican nominee for governor
Nickolas Wildstar (L)

Individuals

- Larry Sharpe, business consultant and candidate for vice president of the United States in 2016, Libertarian nominee for Governor of New York in 2018

Organizations

- Libertarian Party of California
Zoltan Istvan (L)

Organizations

- Libertarian Party of California

=== Polling ===
Graphical summary

View source data.

Poll source	Date(s) administered	Sample size	Margin of error	Travis Allen (R)	John Chiang (D)	John Cox (R)	Delaine Eastin (D)	Gavin Newsom (D)	Antonio Villaraigosa (D)	Other / Undecided
Competitive Edge Research & Communication	May 29–30, 2018	504	± 4.4%	10%	4%	23%	5%	31%	13%	15% (Note: Other 5%, Undecided 10%)
UC Berkeley	May 22−28, 2018	2,106	± 3.5%	12%	7%	20%	4%	33%	13%	11% (Note: Other 4%, Undecided 7%)
Emerson College	May 21–24, 2018	600	± 4.2%	11%	10%	16%	4%	24%	12%	23% (Note: Other 4%, Undecided 19%)
YouGov	May 12–24, 2018	1,113	± 4.0%	10%	8%	17%	4%	33%	9%	16% (Note: Amanda Renteria (D), Robert C. Newman (R), Shubham Goel (NPP) with 1%, all other candidates 0%, Undecided 13%)
Competitive Edge Research & Communication	May 20–22, 2018	501	± 4.4%	9%	7%	22%	8%	26%	12%	17% (Note: Other 4%, Undecided 13%)
SurveyUSA	May 21, 2018	678	± 6.1%	12%	10%	17%	2%	33%	8%	16% (Note: Thomas Jefferson Cares (D), Robert C. Newman (R), Klement Tinaj (D) with 1%; Akinyemi Agbede (D), Juan Bribiesca (D), Christopher Carlson (G), Yvonne Girard (R), Shubham Goel (NPP), Robert Davidson Griffis (D), Zoltan Istvan (L), Josh Jones (G), Gloria La Riva (PFP), Peter Yuan Liu (R), Albert Caesar Mezzetti (D), Hakan "Hawk" Mikado (NPP), Amanda Renteria (D), Michael Shellenberger (D), Desmond Silveira (ASP), Jeffrey Edward Taylor (NPP), Johnny Wattenburg (NPP), and Nickolas Wildstar (L) with 0%; Undecided with 13%)
Public Policy Institute of California	May 11–20, 2018	901	± 4.1%	11%	9%	19%	6%	25%	15%	16% (Note: Other 1%, Undecided 16%)
USC Dornsife/Los Angeles Times	April 18 – May 18, 2018	517	± 4.0%	5%	6%	10%	3%	21%	11%	43% (Note: Akinyemi Agbede (D), Robert Davidson Griffis (D), Amanda Renteria (D), and Gloria La Riva (PFP) with 1%; Juan Bribiesca (D), Thomas Jefferson Cares (D), Albert Caesar Mezzetti (D), Michael Shellenberger (D), Klement Tinaj (D), Christopher Carlson (G), Josh Jones (G), Zoltan Istvan (L), Nickolas Wildstar (L), Yvonne Girard (R), Robert C. Newman (R), Shubham Goel (NPP), Hakan "Hawk" Mikado (NPP), Desmond Silveira (ASP), Jeffrey Edward Taylor (NPP), Johnny Wattenburg (NPP) with 0%; Other 0%; Not voting 0%; Undecided 39%)
Gravis Marketing	May 4–5, 2018	525	± 4.3%	8%	9%	23%	4%	22%	19%	15% (Note: Albert Mezzetti (D) 2%, Undecided 13%)
Big Data Poll	April 27–29, 2018	1,442	± 3.0%	12%	9%	11%	5%	24%	14%	28% (Note: Undecided with 26%)
SmithJohnson Research (R-Cox)	April 26–27, 2018	533	± 4.2%	13%	4%	20%	4%	36%	8%	16% (Note: Amanda Renteria (D) 0%, Undecided 16%)
SurveyUSA	April 19–23, 2018	520	± 5.5%	10%	9%	15%	1%	21%	18%	25% (Note: Robert Newman (R) 4%, Amanda Renteria (D) 3%, Other 1%, Undecided 17%)
UC Berkeley	April 16−22, 2018	1,738	± 3.5%	16%	7%	18%	4%	30%	9%	16% (Note: Other 3%, Undecided 13%)
J. Wallin Opinion Research/Tulchin Research	March 30 – April 4, 2018	800	± 3.7%	9%	9%	16%	5%	26%	7%	28% (Note: Undecided 28%)
Public Policy Institute of California	March 25 – April 3, 2018	867	± 4.4%	10%	7%	15%	6%	26%	13%	23% (Note: Other 1%, Undecided 22%)
SurveyUSA	March 22–25, 2018	517	± 5.0%	7%	9%	11%	3%	22%	14%	34% (Note: Robert Newman (R) 3%; Yvonne Girard (R) and Robert Kleinberger* (NPP) with 2%; Daniel Amare* (R), Brian Domingo* (R), Peter Yuan Liu (R), Michael Bracamontes* (D), Juan Bribiesca (D), and Nickolas Wildstar (L) with 1%; Akinyemi Agbede (D), Zoltan Istvan (L), Josh Jones (G), Harmesh Kumar* (D), and James Tran* (NPP) with 0%; Other 0%l; Undecided 21%. *Withdrawn.)
David Binder Research (D-Newsom)	March 16–21, 2018	1,750	–	13%	9%	16%	2%	29%	7%	24% (Note: Amanda Renteria (D) 2%, Other 6%, Undecided 16%)
Public Policy Institute of California	March 7–13, 2018	1,706	± 3.4%	10%	6%	14%	5%	28%	12%	25% (Note: Other 1%, Undecided 24%)
David Binder Research (D-Newsom)	March 1–5, 2018	1,000	–	10%	13%	16%	7%	26%	12%	16% (Note: Amanda Renteria (D) 4%, Undecided 12%)
David Binder Research (D-Newsom)	January 31 – February 4, 2018	800	± 3.5%	4%	11%	7%	4%	30%	11%	33% (Note: Doug Ose* (R) 4%, Other 29%. *Withdrawn.)
Global Strategy Group (D-Chiang)	January 27 – February 1, 2018	500	–	7%	10%	10%	5%	28%	14%	3% (Note: Doug Ose* (R) 3%. *Withdrawn.)
Public Policy Institute of California	January 21–30, 2018	1,705	± 3.2%	8%	9%	7%	4%	23%	21%	28% (Note: Doug Ose* (R) 3%, Someone else 1%, Undecided 24%. *Withdrawn.)
Tulchin Research/Moore Information	January 21–28, 2018	2,500	± 2.0%	8%	9%	10%	6%	29%	11%	26% (Note: Doug Ose* (R) 4%, Someone else 4%, Undecided 18%. *Withdrawn.)
SurveyUSA	January 7–9, 2018	506	± 4.4%	9%	5%	4%	1%	19%	10%	53% (Note: Robert Newman (R), Doug Ose* (R), Tom Steyer† (D), Peter Thiel† (R), and Steve Westly† (D) with 2%; Akinyemi Agbede (D), Daniel Amare* (R), Stasyi Barth* (R), Michael Bracamontes* (D), Juan Bribiesca (D), Brian Domingo* (R), Yvonne Girard (R), Zoltan Istvan (L), Josh Jones (G), Robert Kleinberger* (NPP), Harmesh Kumar* (D), Peter Yuan Liu (R), James Tran* (NPP), and Nickolas Wildstar (L) with 1%; Michael Bilger* (NPP), Andy Blanch* (NPP), Scooter Braun† (D), John-Leslie Brown* (R), David Bush* (NPP), Christopher Carlson (G), Peter Crawford-Valentino* (NPP), Ted Crisell* (D), Grant Handzlik* (NPP), Analila Joya* (NPP), Joshua Laine* (AIP), Chad Mayes† (R), Jacob Morris* (R), Timothy Richardson* (NPP), Boris Romanowsky* (NPP), Michael Shellenberger (D), H. Fuji Shioura* (NPP), Laura Smith* (R), Scot Sturtevant* (NPP), Ashley Swearengin† (R), Klement Tinaj (D), and Frédéric Prinz von Anhalt* (NPP) with 0%; Other with 29%. *Withdrawn. †Hypothetical candidate.)
UC Berkeley	December 7–16, 2017	672	± 3.8%	9%	5%	9%	5%	26%	17%	29% (Note: Other 1%, Undecided 28%)
Public Policy Institute of California	November 10–19, 2017	1,070	± 4.3%	6%	9%	9%	3%	23%	18%	31% (Note: Other 1%, Undecided 30%)
USC Dornsife/Los Angeles Times	October 27 – November 6, 2017	1,070 (Note: 1,070 likely primary voters out of 1,504. MoE out of 1,504: ± 3.0. 22% out of 1,504 not voting.)	± 4.0%	15%	12%	11%	4%	31%	21%	6% (Note: Other 6%)
UC Berkeley	August 27 – September 5, 2017	1,000	± 4.0%	9%	7%	11%	4%	26%	10%	33% (Note: Undecided 33%)
SmithJohnson Research (R-Cox)	July 27–30, 2017	500	± 4.4%	10%	7%	14%	3%	25%	12%	28%
GSSR (D-Chiang)	May 30 – June 5, 2017	602	–	–	10%	11%	–	26%	12%	–
UC Berkeley	May 4–29, 2017	1,628	± 3.3%	–	5%	9%	3%	22%	17%	44% (Note: David Hadley* (R) 7%, Undecided 37%. *Withdrawn.)
The Feldman Group (D-Villaraigosa)	March 2017	–	–	–	–	22%	–	26%	20%	–

Notes

Hypothetical polling

with Kevin Faulconer and Eric Garcetti

Poll source	Date(s) administered	Sample size	Margin of error	John Chiang (D)	John Cox (R)	Kevin Faulconer (R)	Eric Garcetti (D)	Gavin Newsom (D)	Tom Steyer (D)	Ashley Swearengin (R)	Antonio Villaraigosa (D)	Other / Undecided
UC Berkeley/YouGov	March 13–20, 2017	1,000	± 3.6%	6%	11%	11%	9%	24%	4%	–	7%	25% (Note: Delaine Eastin (D) and Steve Westly with 2%, Undecided with 21%)
Public Policy Polling	January 17–18, 2017	882	± 3.3%	2%	–	20%	13%	25%	4%	12%	9%	16% (Note: Alex Padilla (D) 3%, Undecided 13%)
Field Research Corporation	October 25–31, 2016	600	–	2%	–	16%	7%	23%	5%	11%	6%	30% (Note: Alex Padilla (D) 4%, Steve Westly (D) 1%, Undecided 25%)
Public Policy Polling	February 6–8, 2015	824	–	10%	–	30%	11%	22%	–	–	13%	26% (Note: Alex Padilla (D) 4%, Undecided 22%)

=== Results ===
County results Newsom: 20–30%; 30–40%; 40–50%; 50–60%; 60–70%; Cox: 20–30%; 30–40%; 40–50%; Villaraigosa: 30–40%

Congressional district results Newsom: 20–30%; 30–40%; 40–50%; 50–60%; Cox: 20–30%; 30–40%; 40–50%; Villaraigosa: 20–30%; 30–40%; 40–50%

Non-partisan blanket primary results
Party	Candidate	Votes	%
Democratic	Gavin Newsom	2,343,792	33.7%
Republican	John H. Cox	1,766,488	25.4%
Democratic	Antonio Villaraigosa	926,394	13.3%
Republican	Travis Allen	658,798	9.5%
Democratic	John Chiang	655,920	9.4%
Democratic	Delaine Eastin	234,869	3.4%
Democratic	Amanda Renteria	93,446	1.3%
Republican	Robert C. Newman II	44,674	0.6%
Democratic	Michael Shellenberger	31,692	0.5%
Republican	Peter Y. Liu	27,336	0.4%
Republican	Yvonne Girard	21,840	0.3%
Peace and Freedom	Gloria La Riva	19,075	0.3%
Democratic	J. Bribiesca	18,586	0.3%
Green	Josh Jones	16,131	0.2%
Libertarian	Zoltan Istvan	14,462	0.2%
Democratic	Albert Caesar Mezzetti	12,026	0.2%
Libertarian	Nickolas Wildstar	11,566	0.2%
Democratic	Robert Davidson Griffis	11,103	0.2%
Democratic	Akinyemi Agbede	9,380	0.1%
Democratic	Thomas Jefferson Cares	8,937	0.1%
Green	Christopher N. Carlson	7,302	0.1%
Democratic	Klement Tinaj	5,368	0.1%
No party preference	Hakan "Hawk" Mikado	5,346	0.1%
No party preference	Johnny Wattenburg	4,973	0.1%
No party preference	Desmond Silveira	4,633	0.1%
No party preference	Shubham Goel	4,020	0.1%
No party preference	Jeffrey Edward Taylor	3,973	0.1%
Green	Veronika Fimbres (write-in)	62	0.0%
No party preference	Arman Soltani (write-in)	32	0.0%
No party preference	Peter Crawford Valentino (write-in)	21	0.0%
Republican	K. Pearce (write-in)	8	0.0%
No party preference	Armando M. Arreola (write-in)	1	0.0%
Total votes		6,962,254	100%

=== Results by county ===
Red represents counties won by Cox. Blue represents counties won by Newsom. Green represents counties won by Villaraigosa.

County	Newsom %	Cox %	Villaraigosa %	Allen %	Chiang %	Others %
Alameda	53.5%	10.6%	10.0%	4.4%	9.6%	11.9%
Alpine	38.5%	24.1%	6.7%	8.7%	10.4%	11.6%
Amador	21.5%	41.8%	5.8%	15.1%	8.0%	7.8%
Butte	25.6%	34.4%	5.5%	14.5%	6.1%	13.9%
Calaveras	23.3%	38.2%	5.3%	18.1%	6.6%	8.5%
Colusa	13.0%	43.3%	16.0%	16.3%	3.6%	7.8%
Contra Costa	49.9%	19.7%	8.7%	7.4%	6.9%	7.4%
Del Norte	23.4%	27.0%	3.5%	24.8%	7.7%	13.6%
El Dorado	24.5%	40.7%	5.8%	13.9%	8.1%	7.0%
Fresno	16.8%	33.7%	20.2%	14.3%	7.6%	7.4%
Glenn	12.4%	48.1%	7.9%	18.2%	3.3%	10.1%
Humboldt	37.9%	22.3%	5.0%	9.6%	6.4%	18.8%
Imperial	11.8%	22.7%	31.2%	9.8%	7.9%	16.6%
Inyo	22.6%	30.7%	8.6%	15.9%	8.7%	13.5%
Kern	12.1%	40.6%	13.9%	19.9%	5.4%	8.1%
Kings	9.4%	36.7%	17.0%	23.8%	6.7%	6.4%
Lake	37.5%	28.4%	6.6%	12.0%	5.0%	10.5%
Lassen	13.1%	41.7%	2.1%	26.8%	6.6%	9.7%
Los Angeles	32.7%	19.6%	21.7%	5.8%	13.2%	7.0%
Madera	12.8%	40.2%	15.7%	18.9%	5.2%	7.2%
Marin	64.1%	12.5%	8.2%	3.8%	5.3%	6.1%
Mariposa	19.1%	34.9%	8.2%	23.4%	6.3%	8.1%
Mendocino	45.2%	17.9%	7.8%	9.1%	5.1%	14.9%
Merced	18.2%	29.7%	17.9%	16.0%	7.3%	10.8%
Modoc	11.4%	49.9%	3.0%	18.0%	3.1%	14.6%
Mono	31.6%	26.1%	12.2%	12.0%	5.0%	13.1%
Monterey	37.8%	19.8%	16.8%	9.4%	6.6%	9.6%
Napa	46.1%	19.4%	10.0%	9.7%	5.5%	9.3%
Nevada	34.1%	25.7%	5.9%	17.4%	7.0%	9.9%
Orange	24.3%	36.3%	11.4%	11.5%	9.0%	7.5%
Placer	25.7%	40.2%	5.8%	13.1%	9.0%	6.2%
Plumas	26.9%	38.5%	3.8%	15.5%	5.7%	9.6%
Riverside	22.3%	34.4%	13.7%	15.3%	7.5%	6.8%
Sacramento	29.7%	26.2%	10.7%	10.2%	14.5%	8.7%
San Benito	33.6%	23.4%	13.3%	16.0%	4.8%	8.9%
San Bernardino	19.7%	33.9%	15.2%	14.7%	9.2%	7.3%
San Diego	30.5%	32.6%	10.4%	7.5%	9.8%	9.2%
San Francisco	57.5%	6.6%	9.1%	2.2%	8.9%	15.7%
San Joaquin	26.3%	31.4%	11.1%	13.6%	9.3%	8.3%
San Luis Obispo	33.2%	29.4%	6.8%	14.6%	7.3%	8.7%
San Mateo	55.0%	13.9%	10.4%	5.1%	7.1%	8.5%
Santa Barbara	33.8%	26.2%	12.3%	11.5%	6.8%	9.4%
Santa Clara	48.5%	13.9%	10.9%	8.3%	7.7%	10.7%
Santa Cruz	52.4%	11.8%	11.5%	7.0%	4.5%	12.8%
Shasta	16.9%	44.3%	3.9%	19.9%	4.5%	10.5%
Sierra	22.9%	35.1%	3.7%	17.6%	7.1%	13.6%
Siskiyou	23.3%	34.5%	3.4%	18.5%	5.0%	15.3%
Solano	41.6%	23.3%	8.9%	11.3%	6.9%	8.0%
Sonoma	54.6%	16.4%	8.9%	5.5%	4.9%	9.7%
Stanislaus	23.2%	31.6%	12.3%	16.3%	7.3%	9.3%
Sutter	16.4%	40.0%	8.3%	17.4%	8.2%	9.7%
Tehama	13.2%	45.4%	4.5%	21.6%	4.7%	10.6%
Trinity	23.6%	31.4%	4.7%	17.9%	5.4%	17.0%
Tulare	13.9%	36.5%	16.4%	20.4%	5.2%	7.6%
Tuolumne	26.8%	37.6%	5.7%	15.8%	5.6%	8.5%
Ventura	26.7%	32.6%	13.4%	9.1%	11.0%	7.2%
Yolo	31.6%	19.9%	13.7%	7.0%	14.6%	13.2%
Yuba	16.3%	39.6%	7.6%	21.1%	6.6%	8.8%
Totals	33.6%	25.5%	13.3%	9.5%	9.5%	8.6%

== General election ==
=== Predictions ===
Source	Ranking	As of
The Cook Political Report	Safe D	October 26, 2018
The Washington Post	Likely D	November 5, 2018
FiveThirtyEight	Safe D	November 5, 2018
Rothenberg Political Report	Safe D	November 1, 2018
Sabato's Crystal Ball	Safe D	November 5, 2018
RealClearPolitics	Likely D	November 4, 2018
Daily Kos	Safe D	November 5, 2018
Fox News (Note: The Fox News Midterm Power Rankings uniquely does not contain a category for Safe/Solid races)	Likely D	November 5, 2018
Politico	Safe D	November 5, 2018
Governing	Safe D	November 5, 2018

=== Endorsements ===
John H. Cox (R)

Federal officials

- Condoleezza Rice, former secretary of state
- Donald Trump, 45th president of the United States

U.S. representatives

- Newt Gingrich, former U.S. representative (R-GA-6), former Speaker of the U.S. House of Representatives
- Darrell Issa, U.S. representative (R-CA-49)
- Kevin McCarthy, House Majority Leader (R-CA-23)
- Devin Nunes, U.S. representative (R-CA-22)
- Andrea Seastrand, former U.S. representative (R-CA-22)

State-level officials

- Joel Anderson, California state senator (R-38)
- Dan Logue, former California state assemblyman (R-3)
- Alan Nakanishi, former California state assemblyman (R-10), mayor of Lodi
- Pete Wilson, 36th governor of California

Local-level officials

- Kevin Faulconer, mayor of San Diego

Individuals

- Scott Baio, actor
- Gary Bauer, president of the Campaign for Working Families Committee
- Harmeet Dhillon, Republican National Committeewoman from California
- John and Ken, talk radio hosts
- Louis P. Sheldon, president of the Traditional Values Coalition
- Lara Trump, campaign consultant
- Lew Uhler, president of the National Tax Limitation Committee

Organizations

- American Independent Party
- California ProLife Council

Newspapers

- Inland Valley Daily Bulletin
- Long Beach Press-Telegram
- Los Angeles Daily News
- The Orange County Register
- Pasadena Star News
- The Press-Enterprise
- Redlands Daily Facts
- San Bernardino Sun
- San Gabriel Valley Tribune
- Santa Barbara News-Press
- Torrance Daily Breeze
- Whittier Daily News
Gavin Newsom (D)

Federal officials

- Barack Obama, 44th president of the United States

U.S. senators

- Kamala Harris, U.S. senator from California

U.S. representatives

- Ro Khanna, U.S. representative (D-CA-17)
- Eric Swalwell, U.S. representative (D-CA-15)

State-level officials

- Toni Atkins, California state senator (D-36), incoming president pro tempore of the California State Senate and former Speaker of the California Assembly
- Jim Beall, California state senator (D-15)
- Jerry Brown, Governor of California
- Jerry Hill, California state senator (D-13)
- Ash Kalra, California state assemblymember (D-27)
- Connie Leyva, California state senator (D-20)
- Alex Padilla, California Secretary of State
- Bill Quirk, California state assemblymember (D-20)
- Richard Roth, California state senator (D-31)
- Tony Thurmond, California state assemblymember (D-15)
- Scott Wiener, California state senator (D-11)

Local-level officials

- Jesse Arreguin, mayor of Berkeley
- Tom Butt, mayor of Richmond
- Jose Cisneros, San Francisco treasurer
- Mark Farrell, former mayor of San Francisco
- Robert Garcia, mayor of Long Beach
- Vicki Hennessy, San Francisco sheriff
- Ed Lee (deceased), former mayor of San Francisco
- Alex Randolph, San Francisco City College trustee
- Ahsha Safaí, member of the San Francisco Board of Supervisors
- Libby Schaaf, mayor of Oakland
- Jeff Sheehy, member of the San Francisco Board of Supervisors
- Lateefah Simon, BART board member
- Hilda Solis, member of the Los Angeles County Board of Supervisors and former US Secretary of Labor
- Darrell Steinberg, mayor of Sacramento
- Antonio Villaraigosa, former mayor of Los Angeles

Organizations

- California Faculty Association
- California Federation of Teachers
- California Labor Federation
- California League of Conservation Voters
- California Nurses Association
- California Professional Firefighters
- California Teachers Association
- Equality California
- Laborers' International Union of North America
- NARAL Pro-Choice California
- National Union of Healthcare Workers
- Service Employees International Union California
- Sierra Club

Individuals

- Gabby Giffords, former congresswoman and co-founder of Americans for Responsible Solutions
- Mark Kelly, retired astronaut and co-founder of Americans for Responsible Solutions
- RuPaul

Newspapers

- Bakersfield Californian
- The Desert Sun
- East Bay Times
- Fresno Bee
- Los Angeles Times
- Marin Independent Journal
- The Modesto Bee
- The Press-Democrat
- Sacramento Bee
- San Diego Union Tribune
- San Francisco Chronicle
- San Francisco Examiner
- San Jose Mercury News
- Santa Cruz Sentinel
- The Tribune

=== Polling ===
View source data.

Poll source	Date(s) administered	Sample size	Margin of error	Gavin Newsom (D)	John Cox (R)	None	Other	Undecided
Change Research	November 2–4, 2018	1,108	–	53%	41%	–	–	–
Research Co.	November 1–3, 2018	450	± 4.6%	58%	38%	–	–	4%
SurveyUSA	November 1–2, 2018	924	± 4.6%	53%	38%	–	–	9%
Probolsky Research	October 25–30, 2018	900	± 3.3%	47%	37%	–	–	16%
Thomas Partners Strategies	October 25–27, 2018	1,068	± 3.5%	55%	42%	–	–	3%
Gravis Marketing	October 25–26, 2018	743	± 3.6%	55%	35%	–	–	9%
UC Berkeley	October 19–25, 2018	1,339	± 4.0%	58%	40%	–	–	2%
YouGov	October 10–24, 2018	2,178	± 3.1%	53%	34%	3%	–	10%
Public Policy Institute of California	October 12–21, 2018	989	± 4.2%	49%	38%	2%	–	10%
Thomas Partners Strategies	October 18–20, 2018	1,068	± 3.5%	54%	41%	–	–	5%
Emerson College	October 17–19, 2018	671	± 4.1%	52%	32%	–	–	16%
SurveyUSA	October 12–14, 2018	762	± 4.9%	52%	35%	–	–	14%
Thomas Partners Strategies	October 12–14, 2018	1,068	± 3.5%	51%	43%	–	–	6%
USC Dornsife/Los Angeles Times	September 17 – October 14, 2018	794 LV	± 4.0%	54%	31%	–	–	15%
USC Dornsife/Los Angeles Times	September 17 – October 14, 2018	980 RV	± 4.0%	51%	30%	–	–	19%
Thomas Partners Strategies	October 5–7, 2018	1,068	± 3.5%	54%	42%	–	–	4%
Thomas Partners Strategies	September 28–30, 2018	1,068	± 3.5%	50%	45%	–	–	5%
Thomas Partners Strategies	September 21–23, 2018	1,068	± 3.5%	53%	42%	–	–	5%
Vox Populi Polling	September 16–18, 2018	500	± 4.4%	60%	40%	–	–	–
Public Policy Institute of California	September 9–18, 2018	964	± 4.8%	51%	39%	3%	–	7%
Thomas Partners Strategies	September 14–16, 2018	1,040	± 3.5%	45%	41%	–	–	14%
Ipsos	September 5–14, 2018	1,021	± 4.0%	52%	40%	–	3%	6%
Thomas Partners Strategies	September 7–9, 2018	1,227	± 3.3%	48%	40%	–	–	12%
Probolsky Research	August 29 – September 2, 2018	900	± 5.8%	44%	39%	–	–	17%
Public Policy Institute of California	July 8–17, 2018	1,020	± 4.3%	55%	31%	5%	–	9%
SurveyUSA	June 26–27, 2018	559	± 5.9%	58%	29%	–	–	13%
USC Dornsife/Los Angeles Times	June 6–17, 2018	767	± 4.0%	45%	28%	–	–	27%
J. Wallin Opinion Research/Tulchin Research	March 30 – April 4, 2018	800	± 3.7%	42%	32%	–	–	26%

Hypothetical polling

with Newsom and Chiang

Poll source	Date(s) administered	Sample size	John Chiang (D)	Gavin Newsom (D)	Undecided
Global Strategy Group (D-Chiang)	January 27 – February 1, 2018	500	44%	30%	–
Public Policy Polling	February 6–8, 2015	824	30%	37%	33%

with Newsom and Villaraigosa

Poll source	Date(s) administered	Sample size	Margin of error	Gavin Newsom (D)	Antonio Villaraigosa (D)	Undecided
J. Wallin Opinion Research/Tulchin Research	March 30 – April 4, 2018	800	± 3.7%	38%	21%	41%
Public Policy Polling	February 6–8, 2015	824	–	42%	22%	36%

with Villaraigosa and Garcetti

Poll source	Date(s) administered	Sample size	Eric Garcetti (D)	Antonio Villaraigosa (D)	Undecided
Public Policy Polling	February 6–8, 2015	824	28%	30%	42%

=== Results ===
Newsom won the general election by the largest margin of any California gubernatorial candidate since Earl Warren's re-election in 1950. In addition to winning the traditional Democratic strongholds of the San Francisco Bay Area, Los Angeles County, Sacramento, and North Coast, Newsom performed well in the traditionally swing Central Coast, San Bernardino County (becoming the first Democrat to win it since 1998), and San Diego County, as well as narrowly winning traditionally Republican Orange County – the latter voting for a Democrat for the first time in a gubernatorial election since Jerry Brown's first re-election in 1978. Cox did well in the state's more rural areas, with Stanislaus County being the only county that voted for Brown in 2014 but flipped to Cox in 2018. Cox also narrowly won Fresno and Riverside counties in the Inland Empire in addition to handily winning traditionally Republican Kern County in the Central Valley.

2018 California gubernatorial election
Party	Candidate	Votes	%	±%
Democratic	Gavin Newsom	7,721,410	61.95%	+1.98%
Republican	John H. Cox	4,742,825	38.05%	−1.98%
Total votes		12,464,235	100.00%	N/A
Democratic hold				

==== By county ====
County	Gavin Newsom Democratic		John H. Cox Republican		Margin		Total votes cast
County	#	%	#	%	#	%	Total votes cast
Alameda	462,558	80.55%	111,677	19.45%	350,881	61.10%	574,235
Alpine	386	62.76%	229	37.24%	157	25.53%	615
Amador	6,237	35.45%	11,356	64.55%	-5,119	-29.10%	17,593
Butte	41,500	46.77%	47,226	53.23%	-5,726	-6.45%	88,726
Calaveras	7,765	35.93%	13,845	64.07%	-6,080	-28.14%	21,610
Colusa	1,999	34.69%	3,764	65.31%	-1,765	-30.63%	5,763
Contra Costa	283,805	68.20%	132,345	31.80%	151,460	36.40%	416,150
Del Norte	3,441	41.32%	4,887	58.68%	-1,446	-17.36%	8,328
El Dorado	36,297	40.58%	53,140	59.42%	-16,843	-18.83%	89,437
Fresno	124,332	49.08%	128,974	50.92%	-4,642	-1.83%	253,306
Glenn	2,424	29.09%	5,908	70.91%	-3,484	-41.81%	8,332
Humboldt	33,455	64.49%	18,418	35.51%	15,037	28.99%	51,873
Imperial	20,573	61.67%	12,785	38.33%	7,788	23.35%	33,358
Inyo	3,244	44.67%	4,018	55.33%	-774	-10.66%	7,262
Kern	83,507	41.06%	119,870	58.94%	-36,363	-17.88%	203,377
Kings	12,275	40.58%	17,976	59.42%	-5,701	-18.85%	30,251
Lake	10,869	51.39%	10,280	48.61%	589	2.79%	21,149
Lassen	2,043	22.66%	6,973	77.34%	-4,930	-54.68%	9,016
Los Angeles	2,114,699	71.90%	826,402	28.10%	1,288,297	43.80%	2,941,101
Madera	15,037	39.03%	23,488	60.97%	-8,451	-21.94%	38,525
Marin	103,671	79.49%	26,750	20.51%	76,921	58.98%	130,421
Mariposa	3,183	38.69%	5,043	61.31%	-1,860	-22.61%	8,226
Mendocino	22,152	66.31%	11,255	33.69%	10,897	32.62%	33,407
Merced	30,783	51.99%	28,424	48.01%	2,359	3.98%	59,207
Modoc	820	23.78%	2,628	76.22%	-1,808	-52.44%	3,448
Mono	2,706	55.76%	2,147	44.24%	559	11.52%	4,853
Monterey	76,648	65.98%	39,516	34.02%	37,132	31.97%	116,164
Napa	36,513	64.80%	19,834	35.20%	16,679	29.60%	56,347
Nevada	27,985	52.93%	24,882	47.07%	3,103	5.87%	52,867
Orange	543,047	50.14%	539,951	49.86%	3,096	0.29%	1,082,998
Placer	72,270	41.20%	103,157	58.80%	-30,887	-17.61%	175,427
Plumas	3,433	37.15%	5,807	62.85%	-2,374	-25.69%	9,240
Riverside	319,845	49.81%	322,243	50.19%	-2,398	-0.37%	642,088
Sacramento	302,696	58.81%	212,010	41.19%	90,686	17.62%	514,706
San Benito	11,274	56.12%	8,815	43.88%	2,459	12.24%	20,089
San Bernardino	276,874	51.54%	260,379	48.46%	16,495	3.07%	537,253
San Diego	658,346	56.86%	499,532	43.14%	158,814	13.72%	1,157,878
San Francisco	312,181	86.39%	49,181	13.61%	263,000	72.78%	361,362
San Joaquin	101,474	52.19%	92,966	47.81%	8,508	4.38%	194,440
San Luis Obispo	65,117	51.58%	61,137	48.42%	3,980	3.15%	126,254
San Mateo	213,282	75.23%	70,242	24.77%	143,040	50.45%	283,524
Santa Barbara	93,841	60.49%	61,300	39.51%	32,541	20.98%	155,141
Santa Clara	438,758	71.40%	175,791	28.60%	262,967	42.79%	614,549
Santa Cruz	91,523	76.79%	27,665	23.21%	63,858	53.58%	119,188
Shasta	20,256	28.90%	49,825	71.10%	-29,569	-42.19%	70,081
Sierra	599	35.93%	1,068	64.07%	-469	-28.13%	1,667
Siskiyou	7,218	39.74%	10,946	60.26%	-3,728	-20.52%	18,164
Solano	86,694	61.30%	56,627	38.70%	33,067	22.60%	146,321
Sonoma	152,040	72.27%	58,338	27.73%	93,702	44.54%	210,378
Stanislaus	77,220	49.19%	79,751	50.81%	-2,531	-1.61%	156,971
Sutter	11,122	36.98%	18,953	63.02%	-7,831	-26.04%	30,075
Tehama	5,756	27.55%	15,137	72.45%	-9,381	-44.90%	20,893
Trinity	2,250	42.25%	3,075	57.75%	-825	-15.49%	5,325
Tulare	42,702	42.82%	57,012	57.18%	-14,310	-14.35%	99,714
Tuolumne	9,294	38.93%	14,580	61.07%	-5,286	-22.14%	23,874
Ventura	171,729	55.55%	137,393	44.45%	34,336	11.11%	309,122
Yolo	49,759	67.82%	23,611	32.18%	26,148	35.64%	73,370
Yuba	6,903	35.96%	12,293	64.04%	-5,390	-28.08%	19,196
Totals	7,721,410	61.95%	4,742,825	38.05%	2,978,585	23.90%	12,464,235

Counties that flipped from Republican to Democratic

- Orange (largest municipality: Anaheim)
- San Bernardino (largest municipality: San Bernardino)

Counties that flipped from Democratic to Republican

- Stanislaus (largest municipality: Modesto)

==== By congressional district ====
Newsom won 42 of 53 congressional districts, with the remaining 11 going to Cox, including four that elected Democrats.

District	Newsom	Cox	Representative
1st	39%	61%	Doug LaMalfa
2nd	72%	28%	Jared Huffman
3rd	52%	48%	John Garamendi
4th	41%	59%	Tom McClintock
5th	70%	30%	Mike Thompson
6th	69%	31%	Doris Matsui
7th	52%	48%	Ami Bera
8th	40%	60%	Paul Cook
9th	54%	46%	Jerry McNerney
10th	49.5%	50.5%	Josh Harder
11th	71%	29%	Mark DeSaulnier
12th	87%	13%	Nancy Pelosi
13th	90%	10%	Barbara Lee
14th	76%	24%	Jackie Speier
15th	69%	31%	Eric Swalwell
16th	56%	44%	Jim Costa
17th	72%	28%	Ro Khanna
18th	73%	27%	Anna Eshoo
19th	70%	30%	Zoe Lofgren
20th	70%	30%	Jimmy Panetta
21st	52%	48%	TJ Cox
22nd	43%	57%	Devin Nunes
23rd	37%	63%	Kevin McCarthy
24th	57%	43%	Salud Carbajal
25th	51%	49%	Katie Hill
26th	57%	43%	Julia Brownley
27th	65%	35%	Judy Chu
28th	75%	25%	Adam Schiff
29th	78%	22%	Tony Cárdenas
30th	70%	30%	Brad Sherman
31st	57%	43%	Pete Aguilar
32nd	65%	35%	Grace Napolitano
33rd	68%	32%	Ted Lieu
34th	85%	15%	Jimmy Gomez
35th	66%	34%	Norma Torres
36th	53%	47%	Raul Ruiz
37th	86%	14%	Karen Bass
38th	65%	35%	Linda Sánchez
39th	49.6%	50.4%	Gil Cisneros
40th	80%	20%	Lucille Roybal-Allard
41st	59%	41%	Mark Takano
42nd	41%	59%	Ken Calvert
43rd	78%	22%	Maxine Waters
44th	81%	19%	Nanette Barragán
45th	49%	51%	Katie Porter
46th	64%	36%	Lou Correa
47th	62%	38%	Alan Lowenthal
48th	48%	52%	Harley Rouda
49th	51%	49%	Mike Levin
50th	41%	59%	Duncan Hunter
51st	68%	32%	Juan Vargas
52nd	58%	42%	Scott Peters
53rd	65%	35%	Susan Davis

==== By city ====
By municipality

Official outcome by city and unincorporated areas of counties, of which Newsom won 354 & Cox won 185.
City	County	Gavin Newsom Democratic		John Cox Republican		Margin		Total Votes	2014 to 2018 Swing %
City	County	#	%	#	%	#	%	Total Votes	2014 to 2018 Swing %
Alameda	Alameda	28,663	82.14%	6,234	17.86%	22,429	64.27%	34,897	-3.54%
Albany	Alameda	7,964	91.06%	782	8.94%	7,182	82.12%	8,746	-2.36%
Berkeley	Alameda	53,835	94.69%	3,016	5.31%	50,819	89.39%	56,851	-1.26%
Dublin	Alameda	12,941	68.96%	5,826	31.04%	7,115	37.91%	18,767	1.06%
Emeryville	Alameda	4,320	91.54%	399	8.46%	3,921	83.09%	4,719	1.92%
Fremont	Alameda	45,573	71.14%	18,489	28.86%	27,084	42.28%	64,062	-6.83%
Hayward	Alameda	30,875	79.30%	8,058	20.70%	22,817	58.61%	38,933	-2.91%
Livermore	Alameda	20,795	57.59%	15,314	42.41%	5,481	15.18%	36,109	-2.36%
Newark	Alameda	9,512	72.61%	3,588	27.39%	5,924	45.22%	13,100	-5.94%
Oakland	Alameda	150,152	92.61%	11,982	7.39%	138,170	85.22%	162,134	-1.65%
Piedmont	Alameda	5,680	82.35%	1,217	17.65%	4,463	64.71%	6,897	0.84%
Pleasanton	Alameda	19,338	61.86%	11,924	38.14%	7,414	23.72%	31,262	-0.13%
San Leandro	Alameda	21,730	78.44%	5,974	21.56%	15,756	56.87%	27,704	-5.01%
Union City	Alameda	16,190	77.42%	4,721	22.58%	11,469	54.85%	20,911	-6.22%
Unincorporated Area	Alameda	34,990	71.20%	14,153	28.80%	20,837	42.40%	49,143	-3.70%
Unincorporated Area	Alpine	386	62.76%	229	37.24%	157	25.53%	615	1.78%
Amador	Amador	66	58.93%	46	41.07%	20	17.86%	112	11.84%
Ione	Amador	570	28.90%	1,402	71.10%	-832	-42.19%	1,972	-28.49%
Jackson	Amador	874	43.29%	1,145	56.71%	-271	-13.42%	2,019	-12.02%
Plymouth	Amador	123	32.20%	259	67.80%	-136	-35.60%	382	-26.43%
Sutter Creek	Amador	561	41.19%	801	58.81%	-240	-17.62%	1,362	-16.58%
Unincorporated Area	Amador	4,043	34.42%	7,703	65.58%	-3,660	-31.16%	11,746	-17.86%
Biggs	Butte	187	35.55%	339	64.45%	-152	-28.90%	526	-14.79%
Chico	Butte	21,694	60.27%	14,303	39.73%	7,391	20.53%	35,997	5.24%
Gridley	Butte	783	43.67%	1,010	56.33%	-227	-12.66%	1,793	2.08%
Oroville	Butte	1,817	39.06%	2,835	60.94%	-1,018	-21.88%	4,652	-12.82%
Paradise	Butte	5,015	40.67%	7,317	59.33%	-2,302	-18.67%	12,332	-10.17%
Unincorporated Area	Butte	12,004	35.91%	21,422	64.09%	-9,418	-28.18%	33,426	-10.35%
Angels	Calaveras	665	37.57%	1,105	62.43%	-440	-24.86%	1,770	-17.89%
Unincorporated Area	Calaveras	7,100	35.79%	12,740	64.21%	-5,640	-28.43%	19,840	-15.37%
Colusa	Colusa	608	32.85%	1,243	67.15%	-635	-34.31%	1,851	-31.80%
Williams	Colusa	475	58.79%	333	41.21%	142	17.57%	808	-6.22%
Unincorporated Area	Colusa	916	29.51%	2,188	70.49%	-1,272	-40.98%	3,104	-10.33%
Antioch	Contra Costa	20,731	69.04%	9,296	30.96%	11,435	38.08%	30,027	1.45%
Brentwood	Contra Costa	11,940	53.12%	10,538	46.88%	1,402	6.24%	22,478	-4.89%
Clayton	Contra Costa	3,198	52.80%	2,859	47.20%	339	5.60%	6,057	-5.79%
Concord	Contra Costa	28,530	66.08%	14,644	33.92%	13,886	32.16%	43,174	-1.91%
Danville	Contra Costa	12,472	56.18%	9,727	43.82%	2,745	12.37%	22,199	-0.65%
El Cerrito	Contra Costa	11,210	88.95%	1,393	11.05%	9,817	77.89%	12,603	-1.75%
Hercules	Contra Costa	7,181	78.15%	2,008	21.85%	5,173	56.30%	9,189	-5.66%
Lafayette	Contra Costa	9,798	69.59%	4,282	30.41%	5,516	39.18%	14,080	5.23%
Martinez	Contra Costa	11,605	67.28%	5,644	32.72%	5,961	34.56%	17,249	-2.53%
Moraga	Contra Costa	5,655	66.55%	2,842	33.45%	2,813	33.11%	8,497	3.91%
Oakley	Contra Costa	6,624	55.43%	5,327	44.57%	1,297	10.85%	11,951	-7.25%
Orinda	Contra Costa	7,855	71.03%	3,203	28.97%	4,652	42.07%	11,058	5.16%
Pinole	Contra Costa	5,554	73.47%	2,006	26.53%	3,548	46.93%	7,560	-5.16%
Pittsburg	Contra Costa	13,828	75.96%	4,377	24.04%	9,451	51.91%	18,205	-3.87%
Pleasant Hill	Contra Costa	10,768	69.61%	4,700	30.39%	6,068	39.23%	15,468	-0.60%
Richmond	Contra Costa	27,317	87.43%	3,928	12.57%	23,389	74.86%	31,245	-4.19%
San Pablo	Contra Costa	4,829	86.34%	764	13.66%	4,065	72.68%	5,593	-4.99%
San Ramon	Contra Costa	18,451	64.96%	9,952	35.04%	8,499	29.92%	28,403	3.77%
Walnut Creek	Contra Costa	24,031	69.05%	10,773	30.95%	13,258	38.09%	34,804	2.74%
Unincorporated Area	Contra Costa	42,228	63.68%	24,082	36.32%	18,146	27.37%	66,310	0.23%
Crescent City	Del Norte	501	51.07%	480	48.93%	21	2.14%	981	-10.91%
Unincorporated Area	Del Norte	2,940	40.02%	4,407	59.98%	-1,467	-19.97%	7,347	-17.44%
Placerville	El Dorado	2,103	49.17%	2,174	50.83%	-71	-1.66%	4,277	-7.49%
South Lake Tahoe	El Dorado	4,492	64.84%	2,436	35.16%	2,056	29.68%	6,928	-1.83%
Unincorporated Area	El Dorado	29,702	37.97%	48,530	62.03%	-18,828	-24.07%	78,232	-11.51%
Clovis	Fresno	15,527	38.28%	25,033	61.72%	-9,506	-23.44%	40,560	4.20%
Coalinga	Fresno	1,296	43.36%	1,693	56.64%	-397	-13.28%	2,989	-3.14%
Firebaugh	Fresno	870	66.82%	432	33.18%	438	33.64%	1,302	1.62%
Fowler	Fresno	959	51.23%	913	48.77%	46	2.46%	1,872	-7.21%
Fresno	Fresno	70,507	56.04%	55,316	43.96%	15,191	12.07%	125,823	4.28%
Huron	Fresno	385	79.22%	101	20.78%	284	58.44%	486	-9.86%
Kerman	Fresno	1,639	55.33%	1,323	44.67%	316	10.67%	2,962	-1.73%
Kingsburg	Fresno	1,240	28.85%	3,058	71.15%	-1,818	-42.30%	4,298	3.18%
Mendota	Fresno	848	74.26%	294	25.74%	554	48.51%	1,142	-17.79%
Orange Cove	Fresno	968	75.86%	308	24.14%	660	51.72%	1,276	-11.81%
Parlier	Fresno	1,516	73.66%	542	26.34%	974	47.33%	2,058	-25.70%
Reedley	Fresno	2,680	48.99%	2,790	51.01%	-110	-2.01%	5,470	9.84%
San Joaquin	Fresno	328	77.18%	97	22.82%	231	54.35%	425	-4.95%
Sanger	Fresno	3,534	59.57%	2,399	40.43%	1,135	19.13%	5,933	-4.72%
Selma	Fresno	2,732	54.48%	2,283	45.52%	449	8.95%	5,015	-9.53%
Unincorporated Area	Fresno	19,303	37.34%	32,392	62.66%	-13,089	-25.32%	51,695	1.78%
Orland	Glenn	771	40.66%	1,125	59.34%	-354	-18.67%	1,896	-1.74%
Willows	Glenn	493	29.38%	1,185	70.62%	-692	-41.24%	1,678	-21.63%
Unincorporated Area	Glenn	1,160	24.38%	3,598	75.62%	-2,438	-51.24%	4,758	-10.73%
Arcata	Humboldt	6,643	85.73%	1,106	14.27%	5,537	71.45%	7,749	3.43%
Blue Lake	Humboldt	415	72.55%	157	27.45%	258	45.10%	572	3.20%
Eureka	Humboldt	6,284	67.15%	3,074	32.85%	3,210	34.30%	9,358	1.92%
Ferndale	Humboldt	366	51.26%	348	48.74%	18	2.52%	714	-8.39%
Fortuna	Humboldt	1,718	42.83%	2,293	57.17%	-575	-14.34%	4,011	-13.85%
Rio Dell	Humboldt	360	38.79%	568	61.21%	-208	-22.41%	928	-14.57%
Trinidad	Humboldt	164	78.10%	46	21.90%	118	56.19%	210	-5.19%
Unincorporated Area	Humboldt	17,505	61.79%	10,826	38.21%	6,679	23.57%	28,331	-2.23%
Brawley	Imperial	2,938	56.76%	2,238	43.24%	700	13.52%	5,176	-5.70%
Calexico	Imperial	5,817	81.04%	1,361	18.96%	4,456	62.08%	7,178	-11.47%
Calipatria	Imperial	326	58.53%	231	41.47%	95	17.06%	557	-22.88%
El Centro	Imperial	5,546	62.31%	3,355	37.69%	2,191	24.62%	8,901	-2.17%
Holtville	Imperial	725	57.13%	544	42.87%	181	14.26%	1,269	-0.77%
Imperial	Imperial	2,156	52.61%	1,942	47.39%	214	5.22%	4,098	2.63%
Westmorland	Imperial	221	58.93%	154	41.07%	67	17.87%	375	-14.18%
Unincorporated Area	Imperial	2,844	49.00%	2,960	51.00%	-116	-2.00%	5,804	-0.52%
Bishop	Inyo	675	53.78%	580	46.22%	95	7.57%	1,255	7.46%
Unincorporated Area	Inyo	2,569	42.77%	3,438	57.23%	-869	-14.47%	6,007	3.06%
Arvin	Kern	1,451	75.34%	475	24.66%	976	50.67%	1,926	-11.94%
Bakersfield	Kern	42,060	44.37%	52,728	55.63%	-10,668	-11.25%	94,788	2.14%
California City	Kern	1,304	41.12%	1,867	58.88%	-563	-17.75%	3,171	8.33%
Delano	Kern	4,538	71.58%	1,802	28.42%	2,736	43.15%	6,340	-9.03%
Maricopa	Kern	51	20.48%	198	79.52%	-147	-59.04%	249	-5.03%
McFarland	Kern	1,130	70.32%	477	29.68%	653	40.63%	1,607	-8.44%
Ridgecrest	Kern	2,970	32.59%	6,143	67.41%	-3,173	-34.82%	9,113	3.07%
Shafter	Kern	1,551	49.07%	1,610	50.93%	-59	-1.87%	3,161	-3.89%
Taft	Kern	353	18.90%	1,515	81.10%	-1,162	-62.21%	1,868	-6.48%
Tehachapi	Kern	982	32.72%	2,019	67.28%	-1,037	-34.56%	3,001	-4.17%
Wasco	Kern	1,750	58.57%	1,238	41.43%	512	17.14%	2,988	-9.35%
Unincorporated Area	Kern	25,367	33.75%	49,798	66.25%	-24,431	-32.50%	75,165	-1.15%
Avenal	Kings	630	67.09%	309	32.91%	321	34.19%	939	-3.03%
Corcoran	Kings	1,241	59.98%	828	40.02%	413	19.96%	2,069	-2.83%
Hanford	Kings	5,941	40.82%	8,613	59.18%	-2,672	-18.36%	14,554	1.39%
Lemoore	Kings	2,411	39.27%	3,729	60.73%	-1,318	-21.47%	6,140	2.08%
Unincorporated Area	Kings	2,052	31.33%	4,497	68.67%	-2,445	-37.33%	6,549	5.50%
Clearlake	Lake	1,846	56.98%	1,394	43.02%	452	13.95%	3,240	-21.95%
Lakeport	Lake	957	51.48%	902	48.52%	55	2.96%	1,859	-18.03%
Unincorporated Area	Lake	8,066	50.26%	7,984	49.74%	82	0.51%	16,050	-19.42%
Susanville	Lassen (Note: For Lassen County, California's Supplement to Statement of Vote contains a tabulation error where when combining the city totals, Newsom has 110 more votes than the county total & Cox has 367 more votes than the county total.)	810	26.15%	2,287	73.85%	-1,477	-47.69%	3,097	-28.22%
Unincorporated Area	Lassen	1,343	21.00%	5,053	79.00%	-3,710	-58.01%	6,396	-16.53%
Agoura Hills	Los Angeles	5,949	59.60%	4,033	40.40%	1,916	19.19%	9,982	10.82%
Alhambra	Los Angeles	15,678	71.92%	6,121	28.08%	9,557	43.84%	21,799	2.01%
Arcadia	Los Angeles	8,398	53.30%	7,357	46.70%	1,041	6.61%	15,755	6.10%
Artesia	Los Angeles	2,569	63.92%	1,450	36.08%	1,119	27.84%	4,019	6.45%
Avalon	Los Angeles	588	56.27%	457	43.73%	131	12.54%	1,045	10.42%
Azusa	Los Angeles	7,287	66.19%	3,723	33.81%	3,564	32.37%	11,010	11.50%
Baldwin Park	Los Angeles	11,668	78.75%	3,149	21.25%	8,519	57.49%	14,817	4.38%
Bell	Los Angeles	4,733	83.55%	932	16.45%	3,801	67.10%	5,665	4.51%
Bell Gardens	Los Angeles	5,707	86.09%	922	13.91%	4,785	72.18%	6,629	5.40%
Bellflower	Los Angeles	12,505	68.48%	5,757	31.52%	6,748	36.95%	18,262	16.30%
Beverly Hills	Los Angeles	8,308	62.87%	4,906	37.13%	3,402	25.75%	13,214	3.59%
Bradbury	Los Angeles	170	46.58%	195	53.42%	-25	-6.85%	365	22.04%
Burbank	Los Angeles	28,609	68.84%	12,951	31.16%	15,658	37.68%	41,560	10.94%
Calabasas	Los Angeles	6,580	62.05%	4,025	37.95%	2,555	24.09%	10,605	10.55%
Carson	Los Angeles	23,528	78.80%	6,331	21.20%	17,197	57.59%	29,859	0.47%
Cerritos	Los Angeles	11,146	59.49%	7,589	40.51%	3,557	18.99%	18,735	4.67%
Claremont	Los Angeles	10,116	65.35%	5,363	34.65%	4,753	30.71%	15,479	0.16%
Commerce	Los Angeles	2,789	83.50%	551	16.50%	2,238	67.01%	3,340	4.48%
Compton	Los Angeles	17,769	90.54%	1,857	9.46%	15,912	81.08%	19,626	0.40%
Covina	Los Angeles	9,051	59.57%	6,143	40.43%	2,908	19.14%	15,194	16.76%
Cudahy	Los Angeles	2,890	85.23%	501	14.77%	2,389	70.45%	3,391	-2.25%
Culver City	Los Angeles	16,268	82.48%	3,455	17.52%	12,813	64.96%	19,723	9.12%
Diamond Bar	Los Angeles	9,848	54.70%	8,155	45.30%	1,693	9.40%	18,003	3.83%
Downey	Los Angeles	21,705	68.47%	9,994	31.53%	11,711	36.94%	31,699	18.28%
Duarte	Los Angeles	4,748	66.10%	2,435	33.90%	2,313	32.20%	7,183	11.61%
El Monte	Los Angeles	12,822	74.91%	4,295	25.09%	8,527	49.82%	17,117	1.32%
El Segundo	Los Angeles	4,901	58.93%	3,415	41.07%	1,486	17.87%	8,316	19.23%
Gardena	Los Angeles	13,548	78.42%	3,729	21.58%	9,819	56.83%	17,277	4.44%
Glendale	Los Angeles	35,874	65.80%	18,645	34.20%	17,229	31.60%	54,519	2.69%
Glendora	Los Angeles	8,960	44.11%	11,351	55.89%	-2,391	-11.77%	20,311	11.25%
Hawaiian Gardens	Los Angeles	1,889	75.08%	627	24.92%	1,262	50.16%	2,516	9.22%
Hawthorne	Los Angeles	17,002	81.35%	3,897	18.65%	13,105	62.71%	20,899	11.46%
Hermosa Beach	Los Angeles	6,270	64.99%	3,377	35.01%	2,893	29.99%	9,647	14.77%
Hidden Hills	Los Angeles	504	55.57%	403	44.43%	101	11.14%	907	18.60%
Huntington Park	Los Angeles	7,577	85.57%	1,278	14.43%	6,299	71.13%	8,855	0.74%
Industry	Los Angeles	1,721	76.32%	534	23.68%	1,187	52.64%	2,255	109.78%
Inglewood	Los Angeles	30,499	91.09%	2,984	8.91%	27,515	82.18%	33,483	1.75%
Irwindale	Los Angeles	354	74.37%	122	25.63%	232	48.74%	476	11.36%
La Canada Flintridge	Los Angeles	5,513	53.67%	4,759	46.33%	754	7.34%	10,272	11.27%
La Habra Heights	Los Angeles	1,055	38.21%	1,706	61.79%	-651	-23.58%	2,761	4.70%
La Mirada	Los Angeles	8,493	50.50%	8,324	49.50%	169	1.00%	16,817	9.97%
La Puente	Los Angeles	6,539	76.94%	1,960	23.06%	4,579	53.88%	8,499	2.80%
La Verne	Los Angeles	6,392	46.14%	7,462	53.86%	-1,070	-7.72%	13,854	2.02%
Lakewood	Los Angeles	17,565	57.24%	13,121	42.76%	4,444	14.48%	30,686	9.36%
Lancaster	Los Angeles	22,968	55.54%	18,383	44.46%	4,585	11.09%	41,351	19.52%
Lawndale	Los Angeles	5,671	75.56%	1,834	24.44%	3,837	51.13%	7,505	15.76%
Lomita	Los Angeles	3,917	56.62%	3,001	43.38%	916	13.24%	6,918	12.42%
Long Beach	Los Angeles	100,906	71.35%	40,523	28.65%	60,383	42.69%	141,429	12.26%
Los Angeles	Los Angeles	886,183	79.16%	233,280	20.84%	652,903	58.32%	1,119,463	7.99%
Lynwood	Los Angeles	10,479	85.61%	1,762	14.39%	8,717	71.21%	12,241	-1.74%
Malibu	Los Angeles	3,818	64.70%	2,083	35.30%	1,735	29.40%	5,901	4.96%
Manhattan Beach	Los Angeles	10,917	59.56%	7,411	40.44%	3,506	19.13%	18,328	17.10%
Maywood	Los Angeles	4,053	86.42%	637	13.58%	3,416	72.84%	4,690	-1.39%
Monrovia	Los Angeles	8,495	62.27%	5,147	37.73%	3,348	24.54%	13,642	12.98%
Montebello	Los Angeles	12,583	76.16%	3,938	23.84%	8,645	52.33%	16,521	3.88%
Monterey Park	Los Angeles	9,863	68.03%	4,635	31.97%	5,228	36.06%	14,498	-3.53%
Norwalk	Los Angeles	17,787	71.47%	7,101	28.53%	10,686	42.94%	24,888	9.60%
Palmdale	Los Angeles	25,743	62.63%	15,359	37.37%	10,384	25.26%	41,102	19.06%
Palos Verdes Estates	Los Angeles	3,477	46.86%	3,943	53.14%	-466	-6.28%	7,420	10.90%
Paramount	Los Angeles	8,128	81.50%	1,845	18.50%	6,283	63.00%	9,973	6.19%
Pasadena	Los Angeles	40,596	74.94%	13,573	25.06%	27,023	49.89%	54,169	8.83%
Pico Rivera	Los Angeles	14,146	79.19%	3,717	20.81%	10,429	58.38%	17,863	8.72%
Pomona	Los Angeles	22,558	72.71%	8,468	27.29%	14,090	45.41%	31,026	9.33%
Rancho Palos Verdes	Los Angeles	9,727	50.38%	9,579	49.62%	148	0.77%	19,306	9.18%
Redondo Beach	Los Angeles	19,528	63.53%	11,212	36.47%	8,316	27.05%	30,740	15.48%
Rolling Hills	Los Angeles	340	33.60%	672	66.40%	-332	-32.81%	1,012	12.36%
Rolling Hills Estates	Los Angeles	1,887	46.50%	2,171	53.50%	-284	-7.00%	4,058	10.39%
Rosemead	Los Angeles	6,575	72.18%	2,534	27.82%	4,041	44.36%	9,109	-1.97%
San Dimas	Los Angeles	6,367	46.30%	7,386	53.70%	-1,019	-7.41%	13,753	4.77%
San Fernando	Los Angeles	4,241	78.86%	1,137	21.14%	3,104	57.72%	5,378	3.56%
San Gabriel	Los Angeles	5,949	66.06%	3,057	33.94%	2,892	32.11%	9,006	4.69%
San Marino	Los Angeles	2,577	48.33%	2,755	51.67%	-178	-3.34%	5,332	3.09%
Santa Clarita	Los Angeles	41,479	49.61%	42,131	50.39%	-652	-0.78%	83,610	16.72%
Santa Fe Springs	Los Angeles	3,890	70.15%	1,655	29.85%	2,235	40.31%	5,545	9.36%
Santa Monica	Los Angeles	37,252	81.60%	8,402	18.40%	28,850	63.19%	45,654	7.09%
Sierra Madre	Los Angeles	3,657	61.66%	2,274	38.34%	1,383	23.32%	5,931	8.15%
Signal Hill	Los Angeles	2,773	72.16%	1,070	27.84%	1,703	44.31%	3,843	10.30%
South El Monte	Los Angeles	3,192	79.78%	809	20.22%	2,383	59.56%	4,001	-1.60%
South Gate	Los Angeles	16,120	83.01%	3,299	16.99%	12,821	66.02%	19,419	3.81%
South Pasadena	Los Angeles	9,355	76.06%	2,945	23.94%	6,410	52.11%	12,300	7.24%
Temple City	Los Angeles	5,354	55.92%	4,221	44.08%	1,133	11.83%	9,575	-0.54%
Torrance	Los Angeles	30,831	56.42%	23,813	43.58%	7,018	12.84%	54,644	13.08%
Vernon	Los Angeles	34	73.91%	12	26.09%	22	47.83%	46	11.47%
Walnut	Los Angeles	6,090	58.27%	4,362	41.73%	1,728	16.53%	10,452	1.87%
West Covina	Los Angeles	19,454	65.48%	10,258	34.52%	9,196	30.95%	29,712	11.32%
West Hollywood	Los Angeles	16,146	87.85%	2,234	12.15%	13,912	75.69%	18,380	4.89%
Westlake Village	Los Angeles	2,336	52.67%	2,099	47.33%	237	5.34%	4,435	10.92%
Whittier	Los Angeles	17,550	60.61%	11,404	39.39%	6,146	21.23%	28,954	13.48%
Unincorporated Area	Los Angeles	193,622	68.77%	87,930	31.23%	105,692	37.54%	281,552	9.33%
Chowchilla	Madera	1,043	35.15%	1,924	64.85%	-881	-29.69%	2,967	3.75%
Madera	Madera	5,750	54.20%	4,858	45.80%	892	8.41%	10,608	8.08%
Unincorporated Area	Madera	8,244	33.04%	16,706	66.96%	-8,462	-33.92%	24,950	-0.31%
Belvedere	Marin	809	66.15%	414	33.85%	395	32.30%	1,223	0.50%
Corte Madera	Marin	4,417	81.74%	987	18.26%	3,430	63.47%	5,404	0.82%
Fairfax	Marin	4,248	90.21%	461	9.79%	3,787	80.42%	4,709	-1.58%
Larkspur	Marin	5,848	81.26%	1,349	18.74%	4,499	62.51%	7,197	2.41%
Mill Valley	Marin	7,333	86.66%	1,129	13.34%	6,204	73.32%	8,462	2.43%
Novato	Marin	17,515	71.14%	7,105	28.86%	10,410	42.28%	24,620	-5.07%
Ross	Marin	931	72.17%	359	27.83%	572	44.34%	1,290	9.19%
San Anselmo	Marin	6,521	86.83%	989	13.17%	5,532	73.66%	7,510	0.82%
San Rafael	Marin	19,856	80.14%	4,920	19.86%	14,936	60.28%	24,776	-0.33%
Sausalito	Marin	3,645	81.95%	803	18.05%	2,842	63.89%	4,448	4.23%
Tiburon	Marin	3,746	74.38%	1,290	25.62%	2,456	48.77%	5,036	4.35%
Unincorporated Area	Marin	28,802	80.57%	6,944	19.43%	21,858	61.15%	35,746	1.93%
Unincorporated Area	Mariposa	3,183	38.69%	5,043	61.31%	-1,860	-22.61%	8,226	0.93%
Fort Bragg	Mendocino	1,751	71.70%	691	28.30%	1,060	43.41%	2,442	-6.09%
Point Arena	Mendocino	153	84.07%	29	15.93%	124	68.13%	182	-13.69%
Ukiah	Mendocino	3,353	65.80%	1,743	34.20%	1,610	31.59%	5,096	-9.78%
Willits	Mendocino	1,034	63.40%	597	36.60%	437	26.79%	1,631	-21.20%
Unincorporated Area	Mendocino	15,861	65.93%	8,195	34.07%	7,666	31.87%	24,056	-10.94%
Atwater	Merced	3,374	48.08%	3,644	51.92%	-270	-3.85%	7,018	6.77%
Dos Palos	Merced	575	48.65%	607	51.35%	-32	-2.71%	1,182	8.91%
Gustine	Merced	639	48.12%	689	51.88%	-50	-3.77%	1,328	-12.51%
Livingston	Merced	2,003	73.45%	724	26.55%	1,279	46.90%	2,727	-4.63%
Los Banos	Merced	4,949	58.35%	3,533	41.65%	1,416	16.69%	8,482	3.23%
Merced	Merced	10,759	58.26%	7,709	41.74%	3,050	16.52%	18,468	5.19%
Unincorporated Area	Merced	8,484	42.42%	11,518	57.58%	-3,034	-15.17%	20,002	0.20%
Alturas	Modoc	265	30.15%	614	69.85%	-349	-39.70%	879	-4.94%
Unincorporated Area	Modoc	555	21.60%	2,014	78.40%	-1,459	-56.79%	2,569	-7.61%
Mammoth Lakes	Mono	1,504	63.86%	851	36.14%	653	27.73%	2,355	7.37%
Unincorporated Area	Mono	1,202	48.12%	1,296	51.88%	-94	-3.76%	2,498	0.68%
Carmel-by-the-Sea	Monterey	1,339	63.88%	757	36.12%	582	27.77%	2,096	-3.79%
Del Rey Oaks	Monterey	562	65.73%	293	34.27%	269	31.46%	855	-14.43%
Gonzales	Monterey	1,229	75.08%	408	24.92%	821	50.15%	1,637	-9.72%
Greenfield	Monterey	1,946	76.86%	586	23.14%	1,360	53.71%	2,532	-9.78%
King City	Monterey	1,019	64.58%	559	35.42%	460	29.15%	1,578	-5.37%
Marina	Monterey	4,488	67.94%	2,118	32.06%	2,370	35.88%	6,606	-8.74%
Monterey	Monterey	7,620	70.03%	3,261	29.97%	4,359	40.06%	10,881	-7.34%
Pacific Grove	Monterey	5,638	71.96%	2,197	28.04%	3,441	43.92%	7,835	-8.28%
Salinas	Monterey	21,558	70.22%	9,142	29.78%	12,416	40.44%	30,700	-5.58%
Sand City	Monterey	83	61.48%	52	38.52%	31	22.96%	135	-15.50%
Seaside	Monterey	5,760	71.70%	2,274	28.30%	3,486	43.39%	8,034	-13.75%
Soledad	Monterey	2,410	77.05%	718	22.95%	1,692	54.09%	3,128	-8.86%
Unincorporated Area	Monterey	22,996	57.28%	17,151	42.72%	5,845	14.56%	40,147	-7.76%
American Canyon	Napa	4,875	70.26%	2,064	29.74%	2,811	40.51%	6,939	-11.14%
Calistoga	Napa	1,349	73.92%	476	26.08%	873	47.84%	1,825	-5.64%
Napa	Napa	20,836	65.98%	10,744	34.02%	10,092	31.96%	31,580	-6.81%
St. Helena	Napa	1,923	70.11%	820	29.89%	1,103	40.21%	2,743	-4.36%
Yountville	Napa	991	65.67%	518	34.33%	473	31.35%	1,509	-12.50%
Unincorporated Area	Napa	6,539	55.65%	5,212	44.35%	1,327	11.29%	11,751	-7.81%
Grass Valley	Nevada (Note: For Nevada County, California's Supplement to Statement of Vote contains a tabulation error where when combining the city totals, Newsom has 3,738 more votes than the county total & Cox has 1,867 more votes than the county total.)	3,061	56.07%	2,398	43.93%	663	12.15%	5,459	-9.34%
Nevada City	Nevada	3,738	66.69%	1,867	33.31%	1,871	33.38%	5,605	-20.98%
Truckee	Nevada	5,430	71.43%	2,172	28.57%	3,258	42.86%	7,602	7.04%
Unincorporated Area	Nevada	19,494	48.97%	20,312	51.03%	-818	-2.05%	39,806	-3.38%
Aliso Viejo	Orange	10,622	53.50%	9,231	46.50%	1,391	7.01%	19,853	17.00%
Anaheim	Orange	48,749	56.10%	38,151	43.90%	10,598	12.20%	86,900	12.77%
Brea	Orange	8,014	44.22%	10,111	55.78%	-2,097	-11.57%	18,125	13.10%
Buena Park	Orange	12,218	54.84%	10,062	45.16%	2,156	9.68%	22,280	9.18%
Costa Mesa	Orange	20,969	54.42%	17,564	45.58%	3,405	8.84%	38,533	17.78%
Cypress	Orange	8,426	48.10%	9,091	51.90%	-665	-3.80%	17,517	8.12%
Dana Point	Orange	7,033	43.03%	9,312	56.97%	-2,279	-13.94%	16,345	6.50%
Fountain Valley	Orange	10,866	45.48%	13,027	54.52%	-2,161	-9.04%	23,893	9.40%
Fullerton	Orange	24,631	53.03%	21,812	46.97%	2,819	6.07%	46,443	13.07%
Garden Grove	Orange	23,301	52.74%	20,883	47.26%	2,418	5.47%	44,184	0.30%
Huntington Beach	Orange	39,585	44.95%	48,480	55.05%	-8,895	-10.10%	88,065	10.04%
Irvine	Orange	53,982	61.70%	33,513	38.30%	20,469	23.39%	87,495	19.99%
La Habra	Orange	9,870	53.06%	8,731	46.94%	1,139	6.12%	18,601	16.65%
La Palma	Orange	2,878	50.52%	2,819	49.48%	59	1.04%	5,697	6.15%
Laguna Beach	Orange	8,126	60.57%	5,290	39.43%	2,836	21.14%	13,416	9.74%
Laguna Hills	Orange	6,101	45.87%	7,201	54.13%	-1,100	-8.27%	13,302	15.49%
Laguna Niguel	Orange	14,151	46.52%	16,267	53.48%	-2,116	-6.96%	30,418	12.87%
Laguna Woods	Orange	5,841	51.44%	5,513	48.56%	328	2.89%	11,354	-3.93%
Lake Forest	Orange	15,392	46.79%	17,503	53.21%	-2,111	-6.42%	32,895	16.58%
Los Alamitos	Orange	2,219	49.14%	2,297	50.86%	-78	-1.73%	4,516	10.35%
Mission Viejo	Orange	19,654	43.73%	25,287	56.27%	-5,633	-12.53%	44,941	11.98%
Newport Beach	Orange	17,073	40.21%	25,389	59.79%	-8,316	-19.58%	42,462	14.28%
Orange	Orange	22,644	47.02%	25,510	52.98%	-2,866	-5.95%	48,154	14.05%
Placentia	Orange	8,845	46.27%	10,273	53.73%	-1,428	-7.47%	19,118	14.44%
Rancho Santa Margarita	Orange	8,646	42.55%	11,672	57.45%	-3,026	-14.89%	20,318	11.35%
San Clemente	Orange	11,869	39.74%	17,999	60.26%	-6,130	-20.52%	29,868	6.04%
San Juan Capistrano	Orange	6,292	42.37%	8,559	57.63%	-2,267	-15.26%	14,851	12.36%
Santa Ana	Orange	42,640	70.61%	17,745	29.39%	24,895	41.23%	60,385	3.89%
Seal Beach	Orange	6,676	47.25%	7,452	52.75%	-776	-5.49%	14,128	2.41%
Stanton	Orange	4,799	59.40%	3,280	40.60%	1,519	18.80%	8,079	3.87%
Tustin	Orange	13,686	56.55%	10,517	43.45%	3,169	13.09%	24,203	21.96%
Villa Park	Orange	1,032	30.26%	2,379	69.74%	-1,347	-39.49%	3,411	11.15%
Westminster	Orange	13,147	48.89%	13,742	51.11%	-595	-2.21%	26,889	-4.56%
Yorba Linda	Orange	10,619	33.29%	21,284	66.71%	-10,665	-33.43%	31,903	6.74%
Unincorporated Area	Orange	22,451	41.23%	32,005	58.77%	-9,554	-17.54%	54,456	10.80%
Auburn	Placer	3,335	47.06%	3,752	52.94%	-417	-5.88%	7,087	-10.05%
Colfax	Placer	288	39.61%	439	60.39%	-151	-20.77%	727	-13.28%
Lincoln	Placer	8,833	39.36%	13,611	60.64%	-4,778	-21.29%	22,444	-12.81%
Loomis	Placer	1,025	31.05%	2,276	68.95%	-1,251	-37.90%	3,301	-13.05%
Rocklin	Placer	11,583	41.69%	16,200	58.31%	-4,617	-16.62%	27,783	-6.08%
Roseville	Placer	25,454	43.97%	32,439	56.03%	-6,985	-12.07%	57,893	-8.33%
Unincorporated Area	Placer	21,752	38.71%	34,440	61.29%	-12,688	-22.58%	56,192	-8.12%
Portola	Plumas	281	40.72%	409	59.28%	-128	-18.55%	690	-12.86%
Unincorporated Area	Plumas	3,152	36.87%	5,398	63.13%	-2,246	-26.27%	8,550	-8.96%
Banning	Riverside	4,098	45.89%	4,832	54.11%	-734	-8.22%	8,930	0.61%
Beaumont	Riverside	6,457	44.56%	8,032	55.44%	-1,575	-10.87%	14,489	-1.65%
Blythe	Riverside	1,182	47.04%	1,331	52.96%	-149	-5.93%	2,513	-10.75%
Calimesa	Riverside	1,102	32.02%	2,340	67.98%	-1,238	-35.97%	3,442	-3.39%
Canyon Lake	Riverside	1,139	23.44%	3,720	76.56%	-2,581	-53.12%	4,859	-9.16%
Cathedral City	Riverside	9,363	69.85%	4,041	30.15%	5,322	39.70%	13,404	2.80%
Coachella	Riverside	4,559	84.25%	852	15.75%	3,707	68.51%	5,411	-8.19%
Corona	Riverside	21,645	48.20%	23,265	51.80%	-1,620	-3.61%	44,910	13.46%
Desert Hot Springs	Riverside	3,501	63.50%	2,012	36.50%	1,489	27.01%	5,513	-1.96%
Eastvale	Riverside	9,170	53.62%	7,931	46.38%	1,239	7.25%	17,101	15.22%
Hemet	Riverside	9,872	44.30%	12,410	55.70%	-2,538	-11.39%	22,282	7.25%
Indian Wells	Riverside	763	32.02%	1,620	67.98%	-857	-35.96%	2,383	-3.72%
Indio	Riverside	12,195	57.90%	8,868	42.10%	3,327	15.80%	21,063	-3.28%
Jurupa Valley	Riverside	12,666	56.72%	9,665	43.28%	3,001	13.44%	22,331	21.12%
La Quinta	Riverside	6,672	45.00%	8,156	55.00%	-1,484	-10.01%	14,828	0.99%
Lake Elsinore	Riverside	7,086	46.22%	8,246	53.78%	-1,160	-7.57%	15,332	8.55%
Indio	Riverside	11,969	38.23%	19,338	61.77%	-7,369	-23.54%	31,307	3.42%
Moreno Valley	Riverside	27,706	65.03%	14,898	34.97%	12,808	30.06%	42,604	7.18%
Murrieta	Riverside	12,979	37.17%	21,937	62.83%	-8,958	-25.66%	34,916	5.50%
Norco	Riverside	2,528	28.65%	6,297	71.35%	-3,769	-42.71%	8,825	1.47%
Palm Desert	Riverside	9,851	49.12%	10,204	50.88%	-353	-1.76%	20,055	-0.10%
Palm Springs	Riverside	15,180	76.16%	4,752	23.84%	10,428	52.32%	19,932	2.42%
Perris	Riverside	8,743	72.58%	3,303	27.42%	5,440	45.16%	12,046	4.44%
Rancho Mirage	Riverside	4,470	53.29%	3,918	46.71%	552	6.58%	8,388	4.46%
Riverside	Riverside	46,875	56.19%	36,551	43.81%	10,324	12.38%	83,426	9.30%
San Jacinto	Riverside	5,142	53.22%	4,520	46.78%	622	6.44%	9,662	13.29%
Temecula	Riverside	14,555	40.09%	21,752	59.91%	-7,197	-19.82%	36,307	10.69%
Temecula	Riverside	3,755	35.40%	6,853	64.60%	-3,098	-29.20%	10,608	5.13%
Unincorporated Area	Riverside	44,622	42.41%	60,599	57.59%	-15,977	-15.18%	105,221	3.29%
Citrus Heights	Sacramento	13,441	44.21%	16,963	55.79%	-3,522	-11.58%	30,404	-12.28%
Elk Grove	Sacramento	36,328	58.93%	25,322	41.07%	11,006	17.85%	61,650	-8.82%
Folsom	Sacramento	14,568	46.34%	16,867	53.66%	-2,299	-7.31%	31,435	-7.56%
Galt	Sacramento	3,357	41.67%	4,700	58.33%	-1,343	-16.67%	8,057	-9.40%
Isleton	Sacramento	131	53.91%	112	46.09%	19	7.82%	243	6.49%
Rancho Cordova	Sacramento	12,276	54.27%	10,345	45.73%	1,931	8.54%	22,621	-10.22%
Sacramento	Sacramento	119,162	73.72%	42,476	26.28%	76,686	47.44%	161,638	-4.74%
Unincorporated Area	Sacramento	103,433	52.07%	95,225	47.93%	8,208	4.13%	198,658	-8.47%
Hollister	San Benito	7,153	62.70%	4,256	37.30%	2,897	25.39%	11,409	-15.07%
San Juan Bautista	San Benito	494	70.77%	204	29.23%	290	41.55%	698	-7.68%
Unincorporated Area	San Benito	3,627	45.44%	4,355	54.56%	-728	-9.12%	7,982	-17.69%
Adelanto	San Bernardino	3,056	64.79%	1,661	35.21%	1,395	29.57%	4,717	12.95%
Apple Valley	San Bernardino	7,619	32.72%	15,667	67.28%	-8,048	-34.56%	23,286	0.34%
Barstow	San Bernardino	2,078	46.20%	2,420	53.80%	-342	-7.60%	4,498	4.58%
Big Bear Lake	San Bernardino	656	34.31%	1,256	65.69%	-600	-31.38%	1,912	5.98%
Chino	San Bernardino	11,980	51.41%	11,322	48.59%	658	2.82%	23,302	9.06%
Chino Hills	San Bernardino	12,912	47.59%	14,219	52.41%	-1,307	-4.82%	27,131	6.41%
Colton	San Bernardino	7,145	67.69%	3,411	32.31%	3,734	35.37%	10,556	0.93%
Fontana	San Bernardino	28,876	66.19%	14,750	33.81%	14,126	32.38%	43,626	6.05%
Grand Terrace	San Bernardino	2,083	48.51%	2,211	51.49%	-128	-2.98%	4,294	5.77%
Hesperia	San Bernardino	8,640	40.28%	12,809	59.72%	-4,169	-19.44%	21,449	9.53%
Highland	San Bernardino	7,326	51.03%	7,029	48.97%	297	2.07%	14,355	6.77%
Loma Linda	San Bernardino	3,494	53.18%	3,076	46.82%	418	6.36%	6,570	10.48%
Montclair	San Bernardino	5,546	69.72%	2,409	30.28%	3,137	39.43%	7,955	15.94%
Needles	San Bernardino	420	39.33%	648	60.67%	-228	-21.35%	1,068	-18.75%
Ontario	San Bernardino	23,159	63.15%	13,512	36.85%	9,647	26.31%	36,671	11.66%
Rancho Cucamonga	San Bernardino	28,294	48.81%	29,669	51.19%	-1,375	-2.37%	57,963	8.16%
Redlands	San Bernardino	13,482	49.68%	13,658	50.32%	-176	-0.65%	27,140	6.57%
Rialto	San Bernardino	14,790	71.13%	6,002	28.87%	8,788	42.27%	20,792	5.98%
San Bernardino	San Bernardino	25,911	65.67%	13,548	34.33%	12,363	31.33%	39,459	12.20%
Twentynine Palms	San Bernardino	1,457	41.63%	2,043	58.37%	-586	-16.74%	3,500	3.48%
Upland	San Bernardino	13,055	48.70%	13,751	51.30%	-696	-2.60%	26,806	9.07%
Victorville	San Bernardino	13,167	55.15%	10,708	44.85%	2,459	10.30%	23,875	11.79%
Yucaipa	San Bernardino	6,039	32.13%	12,757	67.87%	-6,718	-35.74%	18,796	-2.15%
Yucca Valley	San Bernardino	2,568	36.99%	4,375	63.01%	-1,807	-26.03%	6,943	-0.78%
Unincorporated Area	San Bernardino	33,121	41.10%	47,468	58.90%	-14,347	-17.80%	80,589	7.94%
Carlsbad	San Diego	29,869	52.44%	27,085	47.56%	2,784	4.89%	56,954	15.48%
Chula Vista	San Diego	49,834	62.54%	29,850	37.46%	19,984	25.08%	79,684	8.58%
Coronado	San Diego	3,591	44.97%	4,395	55.03%	-804	-10.07%	7,986	10.71%
Del Mar	San Diego	1,585	58.90%	1,106	41.10%	479	17.80%	2,691	1.92%
El Cajon	San Diego	11,937	46.40%	13,790	53.60%	-1,853	-7.20%	25,727	8.13%
Encinitas	San Diego	21,178	63.70%	12,068	36.30%	9,110	27.40%	33,246	11.27%
Escondido	San Diego	21,935	50.18%	21,777	49.82%	158	0.36%	43,712	13.30%
Imperial Beach	San Diego	3,984	57.00%	3,006	43.00%	978	13.99%	6,990	1.47%
La Mesa	San Diego	14,178	59.20%	9,770	40.80%	4,408	18.41%	23,948	10.03%
Lemon Grove	San Diego	5,240	62.01%	3,210	37.99%	2,030	24.02%	8,450	10.25%
National City	San Diego	8,567	68.40%	3,958	31.60%	4,609	36.80%	12,525	-3.43%
Oceanside	San Diego	34,167	53.00%	30,304	47.00%	3,863	5.99%	64,471	12.11%
Poway	San Diego	9,664	43.69%	12,456	56.31%	-2,792	-12.62%	22,120	8.78%
San Diego	San Diego	322,870	65.81%	167,724	34.19%	155,146	31.62%	490,594	11.63%
San Marcos	San Diego	16,450	52.59%	14,829	47.41%	1,621	5.18%	31,279	17.86%
Santee	San Diego	9,206	39.68%	13,995	60.32%	-4,789	-20.64%	23,201	6.90%
Solana Beach	San Diego	4,267	59.75%	2,875	40.25%	1,392	19.49%	7,142	14.64%
Vista	San Diego	15,557	53.83%	13,342	46.17%	2,215	7.66%	28,899	19.53%
Unincorporated Area	San Diego	74,267	39.45%	113,992	60.55%	-39,725	-21.10%	188,259	8.67%
San Francisco	San Francisco	312,181	86.39%	49,181	13.61%	263,000	72.78%	361,362	-3.53%
Escalon	San Joaquin	940	33.35%	1,879	66.65%	-939	-33.31%	2,819	-18.58%
Lathrop	San Joaquin	3,491	63.19%	2,034	36.81%	1,457	26.37%	5,525	-11.14%
Lodi	San Joaquin	7,423	38.16%	12,031	61.84%	-4,608	-23.69%	19,454	-6.15%
Manteca	San Joaquin	12,301	50.47%	12,074	49.53%	227	0.93%	24,375	-4.14%
Ripon	San Joaquin	1,927	29.26%	4,659	70.74%	-2,732	-41.48%	6,586	-9.72%
Stockton	San Joaquin	41,952	63.24%	24,384	36.76%	17,568	26.48%	66,336	-2.20%
Tracy	San Joaquin	16,208	60.28%	10,680	39.72%	5,528	20.56%	26,888	-2.33%
Unincorporated Area	San Joaquin	17,232	40.59%	25,225	59.41%	-7,993	-18.83%	42,457	-3.53%
Arroyo Grande	San Luis Obispo	4,555	48.15%	4,906	51.85%	-351	-3.71%	9,461	-8.26%
Atascadero	San Luis Obispo	6,180	46.03%	7,245	53.97%	-1,065	-7.93%	13,425	-7.22%
El Paso de Robles	San Luis Obispo	4,897	42.20%	6,708	57.80%	-1,811	-15.61%	11,605	-5.83%
Grover Beach	San Luis Obispo	2,687	53.04%	2,379	46.96%	308	6.08%	5,066	-8.30%
Morro Bay	San Luis Obispo	3,453	58.93%	2,406	41.07%	1,047	17.87%	5,859	-12.04%
Pismo Beach	San Luis Obispo	2,329	49.43%	2,383	50.57%	-54	-1.15%	4,712	-8.76%
San Luis Obispo	San Luis Obispo	15,205	70.94%	6,229	29.06%	8,976	41.88%	21,434	-2.53%
Unincorporated Area	San Luis Obispo	25,811	47.19%	28,881	52.81%	-3,070	-5.61%	54,692	-6.41%
Atherton	San Mateo	2,200	59.46%	1,500	40.54%	700	18.92%	3,700	19.38%
Belmont	San Mateo	9,137	74.94%	3,056	25.06%	6,081	49.87%	12,193	0.37%
Brisbane	San Mateo	1,660	78.86%	445	21.14%	1,215	57.72%	2,105	-5.27%
Burlingame	San Mateo	9,562	73.55%	3,438	26.45%	6,124	47.11%	13,000	1.37%
Colma	San Mateo	373	81.44%	85	18.56%	288	62.88%	458	-6.77%
Daly City	San Mateo	21,132	78.44%	5,809	21.56%	15,323	56.88%	26,941	-7.69%
East Palo Alto	San Mateo	5,027	89.46%	592	10.54%	4,435	78.93%	5,619	-0.51%
Foster City	San Mateo	8,602	71.73%	3,390	28.27%	5,212	43.46%	11,992	-4.72%
Half Moon Bay	San Mateo	4,141	72.14%	1,599	27.86%	2,542	44.29%	5,740	-3.97%
Hillsborough	San Mateo	3,409	59.42%	2,328	40.58%	1,081	18.84%	5,737	9.53%
Menlo Park	San Mateo	11,656	79.93%	2,927	20.07%	8,729	59.86%	14,583	9.08%
Millbrae	San Mateo	5,955	66.61%	2,985	33.39%	2,970	33.22%	8,940	-7.72%
Pacifica	San Mateo	13,793	75.50%	4,475	24.50%	9,318	51.01%	18,268	-6.71%
Portola Valley	San Mateo	2,028	71.64%	803	28.36%	1,225	43.27%	2,831	5.66%
Redwood City	San Mateo	23,362	77.78%	6,673	22.22%	16,689	55.57%	30,035	4.21%
San Bruno	San Mateo	11,190	73.82%	3,968	26.18%	7,222	47.64%	15,158	-6.27%
San Carlos	San Mateo	11,573	74.06%	4,053	25.94%	7,520	48.12%	15,626	0.78%
San Mateo	San Mateo	29,523	75.50%	9,582	24.50%	19,941	50.99%	39,105	0.70%
South San Francisco	San Mateo	15,944	76.97%	4,771	23.03%	11,173	53.94%	20,715	-5.69%
Woodside	San Mateo	2,093	64.40%	1,157	35.60%	936	28.80%	3,250	11.89%
Unincorporated Area	San Mateo	20,922	76.00%	6,606	24.00%	14,316	52.01%	27,528	0.13%
Buellton	Santa Barbara	1,031	47.21%	1,153	52.79%	-122	-5.59%	2,184	1.10%
Carpinteria	Santa Barbara	3,600	66.04%	1,851	33.96%	1,749	32.09%	5,451	-2.38%
Goleta	Santa Barbara	8,815	65.81%	4,580	34.19%	4,235	31.62%	13,395	4.98%
Guadalupe	Santa Barbara	896	67.57%	430	32.43%	466	35.14%	1,326	-14.29%
Lompoc	Santa Barbara	5,300	49.41%	5,427	50.59%	-127	-1.18%	10,727	-3.55%
Santa Barbara	Santa Barbara	28,870	75.15%	9,544	24.85%	19,326	50.31%	38,414	3.28%
Santa Maria	Santa Barbara	9,874	51.46%	9,313	48.54%	561	2.92%	19,187	-1.55%
Solvang	Santa Barbara	1,329	46.45%	1,532	53.55%	-203	-7.10%	2,861	3.89%
Unincorporated Area	Santa Barbara	34,126	55.40%	27,470	44.60%	6,656	10.81%	61,596	7.94%
Campbell	Santa Clara	12,053	71.80%	4,733	28.20%	7,320	43.61%	16,786	2.10%
Cupertino	Santa Clara	15,424	71.71%	6,086	28.29%	9,338	43.41%	21,510	-1.69%
Gilroy	Santa Clara	10,764	64.04%	6,044	35.96%	4,720	28.08%	16,808	-1.85%
Los Altos	Santa Clara	11,880	72.03%	4,613	27.97%	7,267	44.06%	16,493	2.91%
Los Altos Hills	Santa Clara	3,095	65.42%	1,636	34.58%	1,459	30.84%	4,731	10.55%
Los Gatos	Santa Clara	10,379	67.25%	5,054	32.75%	5,325	34.50%	15,433	2.61%
Milpitas	Santa Clara	13,523	69.47%	5,943	30.53%	7,580	38.94%	19,466	-10.50%
Monte Sereno	Santa Clara	1,215	60.99%	777	39.01%	438	21.99%	1,992	6.00%
Morgan Hill	Santa Clara	10,268	59.90%	6,873	40.10%	3,395	19.81%	17,141	-2.74%
Mountain View	Santa Clara	22,549	80.44%	5,484	19.56%	17,065	60.87%	28,033	1.65%
Palo Alto	Santa Clara	25,172	80.67%	6,033	19.33%	19,139	61.33%	31,205	1.48%
San Jose	Santa Clara	214,071	71.31%	86,120	28.69%	127,951	42.62%	300,191	-5.74%
Santa Clara	Santa Clara	25,574	72.73%	9,590	27.27%	15,984	45.46%	35,164	-3.91%
Saratoga	Santa Clara	10,134	65.08%	5,437	34.92%	4,697	30.17%	15,571	5.14%
Sunnyvale	Santa Clara	32,567	74.73%	11,011	25.27%	21,556	49.47%	43,578	-0.26%
Unincorporated Area	Santa Clara	20,090	65.98%	10,357	34.02%	9,733	31.97%	30,447	-1.35%
Capitola	Santa Cruz	3,795	75.52%	1,230	24.48%	2,565	51.04%	5,025	-6.56%
Santa Cruz	Santa Cruz	26,141	86.41%	4,112	13.59%	22,029	72.82%	30,253	-1.68%
Scotts Valley	Santa Cruz	4,014	64.58%	2,202	35.42%	1,812	29.15%	6,216	-4.35%
Watsonville	Santa Cruz	8,631	79.13%	2,277	20.87%	6,354	58.25%	10,908	-3.04%
Unincorporated Area	Santa Cruz	48,942	73.28%	17,844	26.72%	31,098	46.56%	66,786	-5.27%
Anderson	Shasta	876	29.09%	2,135	70.91%	-1,259	-41.81%	3,011	-15.93%
Redding	Shasta	11,013	31.90%	23,514	68.10%	-12,501	-36.21%	34,527	-18.55%
Shasta Lake	Shasta	1,063	31.00%	2,366	69.00%	-1,303	-38.00%	3,429	-17.84%
Unincorporated Area	Shasta	7,304	25.09%	21,810	74.91%	-14,506	-49.82%	29,114	-18.88%
Loyalton	Sierra	122	38.36%	196	61.64%	-74	-23.27%	318	-5.80%
Unincorporated Area	Sierra	477	35.36%	872	64.64%	-395	-29.28%	1,349	-18.94%
Dorris	Siskiyou	60	31.09%	133	68.91%	-73	-37.82%	193	-7.23%
Dunsmuir	Siskiyou	386	57.70%	283	42.30%	103	15.40%	669	-7.35%
Etna	Siskiyou	97	35.40%	177	64.60%	-80	-29.20%	274	-8.68%
Fort Jones	Siskiyou	78	31.58%	169	68.42%	-91	-36.84%	247	0.52%
Montague	Siskiyou	116	25.05%	347	74.95%	-231	-49.89%	463	-20.63%
Mt. Shasta	Siskiyou	965	61.15%	613	38.85%	352	22.31%	1,578	-12.96%
Tulelake	Siskiyou	27	21.09%	101	78.91%	-74	-57.81%	128	-25.90%
Weed	Siskiyou	384	54.31%	323	45.69%	61	8.63%	707	-10.88%
Yreka	Siskiyou	946	35.86%	1,692	64.14%	-746	-28.28%	2,638	-15.95%
Unincorporated Area	Siskiyou	4,159	36.91%	7,108	63.09%	-2,949	-26.17%	11,267	-6.92%
Benicia	Solano	8,957	65.16%	4,789	34.84%	4,168	30.32%	13,746	-7.39%
Dixon	Solano	3,231	48.85%	3,383	51.15%	-152	-2.30%	6,614	-6.47%
Fairfield	Solano	21,144	62.97%	12,436	37.03%	8,708	25.93%	33,580	-2.70%
Rio Vista	Solano	2,690	53.56%	2,332	46.44%	358	7.13%	5,022	1.43%
Suisun City	Solano	5,683	66.10%	2,915	33.90%	2,768	32.19%	8,598	-6.05%
Vacaville	Solano	15,945	48.01%	17,268	51.99%	-1,323	-3.98%	33,213	-15.75%
Vallejo	Solano	28,725	76.56%	8,797	23.44%	19,928	53.11%	37,522	-5.48%
Unincorporated Area	Solano	3,319	41.35%	4,707	58.65%	-1,388	-17.29%	8,026	-1.90%
Cloverdale	Sonoma	2,337	66.45%	1,180	33.55%	1,157	32.90%	3,517	-7.97%
Cotati	Sonoma	2,487	73.89%	879	26.11%	1,608	47.77%	3,366	-8.67%
Healdsburg	Sonoma	3,928	73.35%	1,427	26.65%	2,501	46.70%	5,355	-6.53%
Petaluma	Sonoma	20,666	73.18%	7,574	26.82%	13,092	46.36%	28,240	-6.61%
Rohnert Park	Sonoma	10,972	69.07%	4,913	30.93%	6,059	38.14%	15,885	-5.39%
Santa Rosa	Sonoma	49,551	73.59%	17,782	26.41%	31,769	47.18%	67,333	-2.78%
Sebastopol	Sonoma	3,676	85.59%	619	14.41%	3,057	71.18%	4,295	-3.21%
Sonoma	Sonoma	4,249	73.15%	1,560	26.85%	2,689	46.29%	5,809	-6.75%
Windsor	Sonoma	7,464	65.03%	4,013	34.97%	3,451	30.07%	11,477	-4.22%
Unincorporated Area	Sonoma	46,710	71.75%	18,391	28.25%	28,319	43.50%	65,101	-5.66%
Ceres	Stanislaus	7,003	60.93%	4,491	39.07%	2,512	21.85%	11,494	-0.20%
Hughson	Stanislaus	967	38.54%	1,542	61.46%	-575	-22.92%	2,509	-7.32%
Modesto	Stanislaus	33,982	52.72%	30,470	47.28%	3,512	5.45%	64,452	-5.02%
Newman	Stanislaus	1,469	55.64%	1,171	44.36%	298	11.29%	2,640	-6.09%
Oakdale	Stanislaus	2,731	35.43%	4,978	64.57%	-2,247	-29.15%	7,709	-15.74%
Patterson	Stanislaus	3,690	65.45%	1,948	34.55%	1,742	30.90%	5,638	2.15%
Riverbank	Stanislaus	3,458	51.92%	3,202	48.08%	256	3.84%	6,660	-3.42%
Turlock	Stanislaus	10,699	47.47%	11,838	52.53%	-1,139	-5.05%	22,537	-5.97%
Waterford	Stanislaus	884	38.74%	1,398	61.26%	-514	-22.52%	2,282	-6.25%
Unincorporated Area	Stanislaus	12,337	39.73%	18,713	60.27%	-6,376	-20.53%	31,050	-5.63%
Live Oak	Sutter	1,000	50.86%	966	49.14%	34	1.73%	1,966	-7.53%
Yuba City	Sutter	8,202	41.25%	11,683	58.75%	-3,481	-17.51%	19,885	-10.61%
Unincorporated Area	Sutter	1,920	23.35%	6,304	76.65%	-4,384	-53.31%	8,224	-17.53%
Corning	Tehama	526	34.63%	993	65.37%	-467	-30.74%	1,519	-11.39%
Red Bluff	Tehama	1,305	35.18%	2,405	64.82%	-1,100	-29.65%	3,710	-14.56%
Tehama	Tehama	50	31.06%	111	68.94%	-61	-37.89%	161	-15.58%
Unincorporated Area	Tehama	3,875	25.00%	11,628	75.00%	-7,753	-50.01%	15,503	-16.12%
Unincorporated Area	Trinity	2,250	42.25%	3,075	57.75%	-825	-15.49%	5,325	-3.82%
Dinuba	Tulare	2,222	59.48%	1,514	40.52%	708	18.95%	3,736	13.50%
Exeter	Tulare	960	33.85%	1,876	66.15%	-916	-32.30%	2,836	6.86%
Farmersville	Tulare	1,018	68.46%	469	31.54%	549	36.92%	1,487	22.67%
Lindsay	Tulare	1,037	66.56%	521	33.44%	516	33.12%	1,558	10.66%
Porterville	Tulare	4,859	47.83%	5,299	52.17%	-440	-4.33%	10,158	5.24%
Tulare	Tulare	5,843	42.19%	8,007	57.81%	-2,164	-15.62%	13,850	8.01%
Visalia	Tulare	15,994	41.79%	22,275	58.21%	-6,281	-16.41%	38,269	9.54%
Woodlake	Tulare	803	68.99%	361	31.01%	442	37.97%	1,164	-4.81%
Unincorporated Area	Tulare	9,966	37.39%	16,690	62.61%	-6,724	-25.23%	26,656	7.37%
Sonora	Tuolumne (Note: For Tuolumne County, California's Supplement to Statement of Vote contains a tabulation error where when combining the city totals, Newsom has 628 more votes than the county total & Cox has 719 more votes than the county total.)	1,170	48.41%	1,247	51.59%	-77	-3.19%	2,417	-14.40%
Unincorporated Area	Tuolumne	8,752	38.38%	14,052	61.62%	-5,300	-23.24%	22,804	-14.90%
Camarillo	Ventura	14,762	48.58%	15,628	51.42%	-866	-2.85%	30,390	1.83%
Fillmore	Ventura	2,577	59.12%	1,782	40.88%	795	18.24%	4,359	5.12%
Moorpark	Ventura	7,569	50.33%	7,470	49.67%	99	0.66%	15,039	7.41%
Ojai	Ventura	2,651	68.73%	1,206	31.27%	1,445	37.46%	3,857	3.98%
Oxnard	Ventura	32,719	71.25%	13,203	28.75%	19,516	42.50%	45,922	1.63%
Port Hueneme	Ventura	3,794	65.10%	2,034	34.90%	1,760	30.20%	5,828	2.39%
San Buenaventura	Ventura	27,787	59.85%	18,642	40.15%	9,145	19.70%	46,429	0.61%
Santa Paula	Ventura	4,858	64.48%	2,676	35.52%	2,182	28.96%	7,534	5.70%
Simi Valley	Ventura	23,925	45.94%	28,156	54.06%	-4,231	-8.12%	52,081	12.00%
Thousand Oaks	Ventura	30,248	51.25%	28,775	48.75%	1,473	2.50%	59,023	6.92%
Unincorporated Area	Ventura	20,839	53.90%	17,821	46.10%	3,018	7.81%	38,660	5.34%
Davis	Yolo	23,512	82.99%	4,819	17.01%	18,693	65.98%	28,331	1.97%
West Sacramento	Yolo	9,848	61.65%	6,126	38.35%	3,722	23.30%	15,974	-14.09%
Winters	Yolo	1,406	58.80%	985	41.20%	421	17.61%	2,391	-5.90%
Woodland	Yolo	10,946	58.34%	7,817	41.66%	3,129	16.68%	18,763	-1.91%
Unincorporated Area	Yolo	4,047	51.16%	3,864	48.84%	183	2.31%	7,911	4.12%
Marysville	Yuba	1,117	39.36%	1,721	60.64%	-604	-21.28%	2,838	-14.07%
Wheatland	Yuba	263	30.72%	593	69.28%	-330	-38.55%	856	-18.33%
Unincorporated Area	Yuba	5,523	35.63%	9,979	64.37%	-4,456	-28.74%	15,502	-10.28%
Totals		7,725,886 (Note: Due to tabulation errors in Lassen, Nevada, & Tuolumne counties making the city totals add up to more than the official county totals, Newsom has 4,476 more votes here than officially recorded statewide.)	61.95%	4,745,778 (Note: Due to tabulation errors in Lassen, Nevada, & Tuolumne counties making the city totals add up to more than the official county totals, Cox has 2,953 more votes here than officially recorded statewide.)	38.05%	2,980,108	23.90%	12,471,664	3.96%

Cities & Unincorporated Areas that flipped from Republican to Democratic

- El Segundo (Los Angeles)
- Hidden Hills (Los Angeles)
- Industry (Los Angeles)
- La Canada Flintridge (Los Angeles)
- La Mirada (Los Angeles)
- Lancaster (Los Angeles)
- Rancho Palos Verdes (Los Angeles)
- Torrance (Los Angeles)
- Westlake Village (Los Angeles)
- Aliso Viejo (Orange)
- Anaheim (Orange)
- Costa Mesa (Orange)
- Fullerton (Orange)
- La Habra (Orange)
- La Palma (Orange)
- Tustin (Orange)
- Eastvale (Riverside)
- Jurupa Valley (Riverside)
- San Jacinto (Riverside)
- Chino (San Bernardino)
- Highland (San Bernardino)
- Loma Linda (San Bernardino)
- Victorville (San Bernardino)
- Carlsbad (San Diego)
- Escondido (San Diego)
- Oceanside (San Diego)
- San Marcos (San Diego)
- Vista (San Diego)
- Atherton (San Mateo)
- Moorpark (Ventura)
- Thousand Oaks (Ventura)
- Unincorporated Area of Yolo

Cities & Unincorporated Areas that flipped from Democratic to Republican

- Placerville (El Dorado)
- Shafter (Kern)
- Gustine (Merced)
- Unincorporated Area of Nevada
- Westminster (Orange)
- Auburn (Placer)
- Blythe (Riverside)
- Citrus Heights (Sacramento)
- Folsom (Sacramento)
- Unincorporated Area of San Benito
- Arroyo Grande (San Luis Obispo)
- Pismo Beach (San Luis Obispo)
- Unincorporated Area of San Luis Obispo
- Lompoc (Santa Barbara)
- Dixon (Solano)
- Vacaville (Solano)
- Turlock (Stanislaus)
- Sonora (Tuolumne)

== Voter demographics ==
CNN exit poll by demographic subgroups
Demographic subgroup	Newsom	Cox	% of total vote
Ideology
Liberals	90	10	34
Moderates	59	41	37
Conservatives	16	84	29
Party
Democrats	93	7	46
Republicans	7	93	23
Independents	53	47	31
Party by gender
Democratic men	92	8	18
Democratic women	93	7	28
Republican men	6	94	12
Republican women	9	91	10
Independent men	53	47	18
Independent women	54	46	13
Gender
Men	56	44	48
Women	65	35	52
Marital status
Married	57	43	57
Unmarried	65	35	43
Gender by marital status
Married men	53	47	35
Married women	64	36	22
Unmarried men	58	42	19
Unmarried women	68	32	24
Race and ethnicity
White	57	43	63
Black	84	16	6
Latino	64	36	19
Asian	65	35	8
Other	71	29	3
Gender by race and ethnicity
White men	54	46	31
White women	59	41	32
Black men	78	22	2
Black women	87	13	4
Latino men	61	39	9
Latino women	67	33	10
Others	67	33	11
Religion
Protestant, Other Christian	46	54	34
Catholic	56	44	21
Jewish	72	28	4
Other religion	76	24	10
No religion	79	21	31
Religious service attendance
Weekly or more	46	54	21
A few times a month	56	44	13
A few times a year	71	29	23
Never	69	31	43
White evangelical or born-again Christian
Yes	18	82	11
No	65	35	89
Age
18–24 years old	72	28	8
25–29 years old	66	34	7
30–39 years old	65	35	15
40–49 years old	58	42	14
50–64 years old	56	44	29
65 and older	57	43	27
Sexual orientation
LGBT	83	17	5
Heterosexual	58	42	95
First time voter
First time voter	69	31	18
Everyone else	58	42	82
Education
High school or less	58	42	19
Some college education	56	44	29
Associate degree	60	40	13
Bachelor's degree	65	35	24
Advanced degree	63	37	16
Education by race and ethnicity
White college graduates	59	41	28
White no college degree	55	45	35
Non-white college graduates	78	22	11
Non-white no college degree	64	36	25
Education by race, ethnicity, and sex
White women with college degrees	62	38	13
White women without college degrees	56	44	19
White men with college degrees	56	44	15
White men without college degrees	52	48	17
Non-whites	68	32	36
Family income
Under $30,000	57	43	17
$30,000–49,999	66	34	21
$50,000–99,999	55	45	22
$100,000–199,999	45	55	27
Over $200,000	41	59	13
Military service
Veterans	32	68	14
Non-veterans	64	36	86
Issue regarded as most important
Health care	85	15	43
Immigration	36	64	18
Economy	35	65	21
Gun policy	66	34	15

== See also ==
- 2018 California lieutenant gubernatorial election
- 2018 California State Treasurer election
- 2021 California gubernatorial recall election
