= Pasadena Star-News =

Newspaper in Pasadena, California

- Type: Daily newspaper
- Format: Broadsheet
- Owner(s): Southern California News Group (MediaNews Group)
- Founder: H.J. Vail
- Publisher: Ron Hasse
- Editor: Frank Pine
- Photo editor: Keith Birmingham
- Founded: 1886
- Language: English
- Headquarters: 2 N. Lake Ave. Suite 150; Pasadena, California 91101
- Sister newspapers: Los Angeles Daily News; San Gabriel Valley Tribune; Whittier Daily News
- Website: pasadenastarnews.com

The Pasadena Star-News is a local daily newspaper for the greater Pasadena, California area. The Pasadena Star-News has been a member of the Southern California News Group (formerly the Los Angeles Newspaper Group) since 1996. It is also part of the San Gabriel Valley Newspaper Group, along with the San Gabriel Valley Tribune and the Whittier Daily News. It is a paid newspaper with free online content.

== History ==
In April 1886, H.J. Vail published the first issue of the Pasadena Star. In 1889, the Star absorbed the Union. In 1890, a stock company headed by George F. Kernaghan bought the Star. In 1891, Charles A. Gardner bought out Kernaghan and became editor and publisher. In 1900, J.P. Baumgartner sold his interests in the Riverside Press and bought the Star and installed. He then Lyman M. King as editor.

In November 1904, Charles H. Prisk purchased the Pasadena Daily Star and installed Ernest H. Haack as editor. In December 1910, Prisk became co-owner of the Long Beach Press. On March 1, 1916, the Star merged with the Pasadena Daily News (founded in 1894) to form the Pasadena Star-News. For a time, William Paddock, Prisk's son-in-law who married his daughter Neva Prisk Malaby, was the vice president and general manager of the business. In 1932, the Star bought and absorbed the Pasadena Post. In March 1940, Prisk died and was succeeded by his brother William F. Prisk as the paper's publisher. In 1956, Ridder Publications Inc. bought the Star-News and Independent from W.F. Prisk, E.D. Bates and Fred Runyon. Bernard J. Ridder took over as publisher.

In 1974, Ridder merged with Knight Newspapers Inc. to form Knight Ridder. In 1989, the Star-News and subsidiary Foothill Intercity Newspapers were sold for $55 million to MediaNews Group, a company owned by William Dean Singleton. At that time the paper had a 39,000 daily circulation. A year later Thomson Corporation, which owned the San Gabriel Valley Tribune, bought a majority stake in the Star-News while Singleton retained a minority interest. In 1996, Thomson sold the Star-News, Tribune, and Whittier Daily News to MediaNews Group. The three papers went on to become part of the subsidiary Los Angeles Newspaper Group.

Tournament of Roses New Year's Number 1917

== Rose Magazine ==
The newspaper publishes the Rose Magazine, which has provided coverage of the Tournament of Roses Parade and the Rose Bowl Game since 1994.

== Office ==
First published in 1884, the paper was originally located at the corner of Colorado Boulevard and Oakland Avenue for years. That building is now home to Technique at Le Cordon Bleu College of Culinary Arts and 24 Hour Fitness. The first radio broadcast of the Rose Parade in 1926 aired from the newspaper's radio station KPSN, which broadcast out of a pair of radio towers that the building once hosted.

== See also ==
- Charles H. Prisk
- William F. Prisk

== Awards ==
- The California Newspapers Publishers Association awarded the Pasadena Star-News four of the top journalism awards out of thirty-eight awards given to its parent company Los Angeles News Group at the annual awards luncheon in San Diego.
- The California Newspaper Publisher Association, the state's press association, named the Pasadena Star-News, California's best mid-sized daily in 2015.
- Winner of the California Newspaper Association's award given for best website.
