= Auditorial =

Audio editorial used by journalists

An auditorial is an audio editorial used by journalists to satirize a phrase, speech or statement through an audio recording of the phrase, speech of statement.

A common practice is to take a short phrase from a speech and loop it repeatedly over background music, usually generic electronic music. Humor and satire are the main devices of an auditorial, often encouraging the general public to laugh at and criticize the figure in question.

== History ==
The term auditorial was coined in 2007 by Nate Miller, 2006-2007 editor in chief of The State Hornet, the student newspaper of Sacramento State.

The State Hornet was the first news organization to use an auditorial as an official journalistic opinion piece. The auditorial criticized Athletics Director Terry Wanless after he downplayed a possible incident of hazing, speculating that pictures of freshmen soccer players depicting chiefing might be showing "a masquerade party." Chiefing, also sometimes known as marking, is a common form of hazing in which "Victims are made to wear visible symbols, drawings or text (obscenities, instructions for abuse) on (under)clothing or on bare skin." The auditorial received mixed responses, with some commenting that it detracted from the legitimacy of The State Hornet.

The article upon which the auditorial was based has since been recognized by a variety of media organizations, including second place Breaking News Story by the California College Media Association in 2008. The February 14 issue of The State Hornet, which printed the first story covering the controversy, won Best of Show honorable mention at the 2007 ACP National College Newspaper Convention. The February 14, February 21 and February 28 issues of The State Hornet were recognized in 2007 as one of the top six newspapers in the General Excellence 4-Year University Division by the CNPA.

== Importance ==
Auditorials represent a new medium for news organizations to express their opinions. Previously limited to what could be printed on the editorial page of a newspaper (such as editorials, columns, letters to the editor and editorial cartoons) or what could be said over the radio or television, journalists now have an entirely new medium—one which uses short clips from audio recordings of prominent public figures—to express their opinion.

== Similar works ==
The concept of auditorials, some might argue, was made popular by spoofs on Howard Dean's infamous "I have a scream" speech during the 2004 United States Presidential campaign. These remixes, however, cannot be considered true auditorials, as they were not created as an official piece of work by a credible newspaper or other journalistic outlet. They did, however, help popularize the general concept and idea of satirical repetition of an outlandish phrase or speech.

Numerous "remixes" of George W. Bush exist, including a highly-popular YouTube video compiling hundreds of Bush's speeches into a rendition of U2's "Sunday, Bloody Sunday." although no official journalistic auditorials have been produced by newspapers or journalists.

== See also ==
- Editorial
- Hazing
