= William F. Prisk =

American executive and politician from California

- (undated)

Member of the California Senate from the 3rd district
- In office January 4, 1897 – January 1, 1901
- Preceded by: Tirey L. Ford
- Succeeded by: John R. Tyrrell

Personal details
- Born: April 2, 1870 Grass Valley, California
- Died: December 21, 1962 (aged 92) Grass Valley, California
- Party: Democratic
- Occupation: Newspaper executive, politician

William Frederick Prisk, Jr. (April 2, 1870 – December 21, 1962) was a California newspaper executive and a politician from California.

== Biography ==
Prisk was born in Grass Valley, California. Prisk's father was William Prisk, a miner. Prisk's mother was Mary (Hosking) Prisk. Prisk's parents were natives of Camborne, Cornwall, England, who settled in Grass Valley, California.

Prisk held posts on the Grass Valley Union (editor and publisher), Evening Telegraph (publisher, typesetter, reporter and business manager), Pasadena Star-News (co-owner with his brother Charles H. Prisk), Long Beach Press-Telegram (editor-publisher). He was elected to the California State Senate in 1897, and at the time, was the youngest member of the California State Legislature. For his many years as editor-publisher of the Press-Telegram, he received the nickname "Mr. Long Beach".

Prisk became a naturalized U.S. citizen in 1869. Three years after his death in Long Beach, he was selected to the California Newspaper Publishers Association's Newspaper Hall of Fame.

== Legacy ==
The William F. Prisk Elementary School in the Long Beach Unified School District is named in his honor.

== Selected works ==
- 1895 pictorial history of Nevada County, California
- Nevada County Mining Review
