= Charles H. Prisk =

American journalist

- Prisk in a 1923 publication
- Born: Charles Henry Prisk; December 24, 1875; Grass Valley, California
- Died: March 4, 1940 (aged 64); Pasadena, California
- Occupation: Newspaper executive
- Known for: Editor and owner of the Pasadena Star-News; owner of the Pasadena Post, owner of the Long Beach Press-Telegram

Charles Henry Prisk (1875 – 1940) was a California newspaper executive who was influential in connection with the advancement of civic and material progress and prosperity in the city of Pasadena. He was editor and owner of the Pasadena Star-News; and he owned the Pasadena Post, and the Long Beach Press-Telegram, of which his brother, William F. Prisk, was the publisher. Prisk was also the publisher of the Grass Valley Union in Nevada County, California.

== Early life and education ==
Prisk was born in Grass Valley, California, December 24, 1875. His parents, William Frederick Prisk, Sr. and Mary (Hosking) Prisk, were from Camborne, Cornwall, England, and they settled in Grass Valley where his father actively identified with mining enterprise in California for more than a third of a century. Prisk's older siblings were William F., James H., and Mrs. Edgar M. Shaw.

Prisk began working in the newspaper business at age 12.

Prisk attended the public schools of Grass Valley and took a special course at Leland Stanford, Jr., University. He graduated from Stanford University.

== Career ==
Even before entering his teens, Prisk carried newspapers at Grass Valley. For a number of years, he was a member of the reportorial and editorial staffs of the Grass Valley Union. Thereafter, he became associated with his brother, William, and A. J. Hosking in conducting the Watsonville Register. However, within a few months’ time with his brother and Hosking, Prisk found it possible to purchase the plant and business of the Pasadena Star, which, in 1915, was consolidated with the News, under the title of the Pasadena Star-News. He served as editor and manager of this paper.

In addition to his association with the Star-News, Prisk was one of the principal owners of the Long Beach Press, being the vice-president and a director of the company.

He was affiliated with San Pasqual Lodge, F and A. M., the local bodies of the York Rite of Masonry, and the Scottish Rite bodies, in the Consistory of which he received the thirty-second degree. He was affiliated also with Pasadena Lodge No. 672, Benevolent and Protective Order of Elks, and with the Native Sons of the Golden West. He was a member of the Chamber of Commerce, the Merchants’ Association, the Twilight, the New Century, the University and the Overland clubs, as well as of the Annandale, the Flintridge Country and the Pasadena Golf clubs.

Prisk served as President of Pasadena's Rotary Club, and on the Board of Directors of First Trust and Savings Bank of Pasadena.

== Personal life ==
At Los Angeles, on June 5, 1903, he married Mabel Pauline Peterson (born in Illinois, a daughter of Charles Peterson, who was engaged in the grocery business, and who died in Pasadena, as did also his wife. Mrs. Prisk spent the greater part of her early life in Chicago. Mr. and Mrs. Prisk were members of the Presbyterian Church.

Mr. and Mrs. Prisk had one daughter, Neva J., who was born at Grass Valley. She married the Olympian, Charles William Paddock.

== Legacy ==
Charles H. Prisk died at the Huntington Memorial Hospital in Pasadena, on March 4, 1940.

A portrait of Prisk by Stephen Seymour Thomas is part of the Pasadena Historical Society collection.
