= Leona Egeland Rice =

California politician

Leona Egeland Rice is a science teacher who served as a state legislator and public official in California. A Democrat, she was elected to the California Assembly in 1974, 1976, and 1978. She was born in Tucson, Arizona. She received a masters in education from San Jose State University.

When she was first elected she was one of two women in the California Assembly. She pushed to change how members were referred to from Assemblyman to Assembly Member.
