= Whittier Daily News =

Newspaper in Whittier, California

- Type: Daily newspaper
- Format: Broadsheet
- Owner(s): Southern California News Group (MediaNews Group)
- Founder(s): Shirley L. Holt; A.C. Harvey-Elder
- Publisher: Ron Hasse
- Editor: Frank Pine
- Founded: 1905
- Language: English
- Headquarters: Monrovia, California
- Sister newspapers: San Gabriel Valley Tribune, Pasadena Star-News
- ISSN: 1069-2819
- OCLC number: 27967112
- Website: whittierdailynews.com

The Whittier Daily News is a paid local daily newspaper for Whittier, California, United States. Coverage area includes Whittier, South Whittier, Pico Rivera, La Habra Heights, Santa Fe Springs and La Mirada.

The Whittier Daily News is a member of Southern California News Group (formerly the Los Angeles Newspaper Group), a division of Digital First Media. It is also part of the San Gabriel Valley Newspaper Group, along with the San Gabriel Valley Tribune and the Pasadena Star-News. Digital First Media is owned by Alden Global Capital.

== History ==
The first issue of the Whittier Daily News was published on Feb. 2, 1905. It was founded by Shirley L. Holt and A.C. Harvey-Elder. W.E. Willis bought the paper in 1908. He retired in September 1910 due to his wife's failing health and sold the paper for $55,000 to Harry H. Hiener and Harry C. Holdsworth, who previously owned the Arizona Silver Belt together.

Hiener was later succeeded by Harlan W. Hall in October 1911, who sold his share in April 1912 to Rex B. Kennedy, who became editor. Kennedy operated the paper for 41 years until his death in June 1953. He wrote a column called "Heard in the Barber Shop" and was an early political sponsor of Richard Nixon and credited with starting him on the 1946 campaign which landed Nixon in Congress.

His estate of sold the paper in January 1954 to Leo E. Owens of Palm Springs. After his death in 1975, his son Lee E. Owens managed the business. He sold the Daily News and East Whittier Review in 1982 to Thomson Newspapers, owner of the San Gabriel Valley Tribune. At that time the Daily News has a 18,000 circulation. In 1996, Thomson sold the Daily News and two others to William Dean Singleton's MediaNews Group.
