= San Gabriel Valley Tribune =

Daily newspaper in Southern California

- Type: Daily newspaper
- Format: Broadsheet
- Owner(s): Southern California News Group (MediaNews Group)
- Founder: Carl P. Miller
- Publisher: Ron Hasse
- Editor: Frank Pine
- Photo editor: Keith Birmingham
- Founded: 1955
- Language: English
- Headquarters: 181 W Huntington Dr Ste 209 Monrovia, California 91016
- Circulation: 57,558 Daily; 76,478 Sunday (as of March 2013)
- Sister newspapers: Pasadena Star-News; Whittier Daily News
- ISSN: 8755-9595
- OCLC number: 1010663846
- Website: sgvtribune.com

The San Gabriel Valley Tribune is a paid daily newspaper headquartered in Monrovia, California, that serves the central and eastern San Gabriel Valley. It operated from a West Covina location from 1955 to 2015. The Tribune is a member of Southern California News Group (formerly the Los Angeles Newspaper Group), a division of Digital First Media. It is also part of the San Gabriel Valley Newspaper Group, along with the Pasadena Star-News and the Whittier Daily News.

== History ==
In 1947, the owners of the Covina Argus-Citizen founded the Baldwin Park Tribune, a weekly paper for residents of Baldwin Park, California. The papers' cooperate owner was headed by Carl P. Miller and included Corwin Hoffland, A.Q. Miller Jr. and Alba Hibsch. The new paper's first editor was Ted Weegar.

On March 21, 1955, the San Gabriel Valley Tribune was launched in West Covina, California. The daily paper was founded after Miller's company merged together two weeklies, the Sunday Valley Tribune and Baldwin Park Tribune. The new paper's paid circulation was 15,000. Later that year the Tribune joined the Associated Press news network.

In 1960, the newspaper chain Brush-Moore purchased the Tribune. Thomson Newspapers purchased Brush-Moore in 1967 and sold the Tribune to MediaNews Group in 1996. At that time the company was headed by William Dean Singleton.
