= Press-Telegram =

Daily newspaper in Long Beach, California

Long Beach Press-Telegram
- Type: Daily newspaper
- Format: Broadsheet
- Owner(s): Southern California News Group (MediaNews Group)
- Founder: John D. Palmer
- Publisher: Ron Hasse
- Editor: Frank Pine
- Founded: 1897; 129 years ago
- Language: English
- Headquarters: Long Beach, California
- Circulation: 41,038 Daily; 60,286 Sunday (as of September 2014)
- Website: presstelegram.com

The Press-Telegram is a paid daily newspaper published in Long Beach, California. Coverage area for the Press-Telegram includes Long Beach, Lakewood, Signal Hill, Artesia, Bellflower, Cerritos, Compton, Downey, Hawaiian Gardens, Lynwood, Norwalk and Paramount.

== History ==
In September 1897, the twice-weekly Long Beach Press was founded by John D. Palmer and Mr. Smith. The two quickly bought the facility of the Long Beach Breaker to utilize for their business. J.A. Miller bought the Press from them and edited it for seven years until he sold it in 1904 to A.C. Malone, the paper's business manager. Malone sold out to a company called Press Publishing, of which J.P. Baumgartner was heavily invested.

Baumgartner was president of the National Editorial Association. He secured control of the Press after buying out C.L. Day and sold it. In December 1910, the Press was acquired from Baumgartner by A.J. Hosking and brothers Charles H. Prisk and William F. Prisk. In 1924, the Long Beach Press merged with the Long Beach Daily Telegram. W.F. Frisk was made company president and Belle McCord Roberts made vice president. Frank M. Selover was named editor. In 1932, the Press-Telegram bought and absorbed the Long Beach Daily Sun.

In 1952, the Press-Telegram and Independent were acquired by the Ridder family, who owned a dozen papers, along with several radio and television stations. The two Long Beach papers had a combined circulation of approximately 243,000 at their peak in the late 1960s, under publisher Daniel Ridder and executive editor Miles Sines, making them the second largest printed news source in the Los Angeles area, behind the Los Angeles Times and ahead of the strike-decimated Herald-Examiner. Soon after the purchase, the Long Beach Independent (founded in 1938) merged with the Press-Telegram, with the Independent becoming the newspaper's morning edition and the Press-Telegram the evening edition.

In 1974, Ridder Publications Inc. merged with Knight Newspapers Inc. to form Knight Ridder. In 1981, the Independent was discontinued. In 1997, Knight Ridder sold the Press-Telegram to Garden State Newspapers Inc., an affiliate MediaNews Group. Garden State later became the Los Angeles Newspaper Group. In 2011, the paper eliminated its sports, photography, and features departments. Some of the eliminated positions were picked up by the Torrance Daily Breeze, a sibling publication. In 2013, MediaNews Group and 21st Century Media merged into Digital First Media.

== Headquarters ==
The paper's longtime home, the Press-Telegram building at 6th Street and Pine Avenue, was sold in late 2006 to real estate developers intending to convert the property into condominiums. The paper's operations were moved to the Arco Center in Downtown Long Beach. The building at 6th Street and Pine Avenue in Downtown Long Beach occupied nearly the entire block, and at one time encompassed the entire production of the paper, including the presses, which were formerly visible behind glass windows at street level. The old building on Pine Avenue was eventually acquired and redeveloped by Molina Healthcare. The paper is currently located at 5225 E. Second St., Suite 400, Long Beach, CA 90803.

== Notable coverage ==
On September 30, 1933, the Press-Telegram published what David Dayen called "One of the more influential letters to the editor in American history": Francis Townsend's letter outlining the Townsend Plan, a proposal that sparked a national campaign which influenced the establishment of the Roosevelt administration's Social Security system.

== Political endorsements ==
For the 2016 presidential election, the paper chose to endorse no candidate. This was later repeated in the 2020 cycle.

For the 2021 California recall election, the paper joined its fellow members of the Southern California News Group and endorsed the recall, while also endorsing Republican Larry Elder to replace Democratic Governor Gavin Newsom.

== Alumni ==
- David Shaw
- Rich Roberts (Los Angeles Times)
- John Cash (Las Vegas Sun)
- Bill Wasserzieher (Village Voice)
