= California News Publishers Association =

Trade association for California newspapers

CNPA logo

The California News Publishers Association (CNPA) is a nonprofit trade association founded in 1888 that represents the daily, weekly, monthly, and campus newspapers of California. Its diverse membership consists of over 700 newspapers that elect 35 individuals to its governing board of directors. CNPA's mission statement reads:

To champion the ideals of a free press in our democratic society, and to promote the quality and economic health of California newspapers.

The association influences legislation on behalf of free speech in Sacramento, sponsors an annual newspaper contest and convention, and offers seminars on media law, production, writing and editing, advertising, and circulation.

== Better Newspapers Contest ==
CNPA sponsors an annual Better Newspapers Contest (BNC) to recognize the most outstanding journalistic achievements published by California newspapers. Daily and weekly publications compete in separate divisions based on circulation.

CNPA also sponsors an annual Campus Excellence in Journalism offering separate divisions of competition for high schools, 2-year colleges, and 4-year universities. The Campus newspapers compete in many categories involving writing, photography and general excellence.

== Freedom of Information ==
In July 2007, the CNPA intervened in litigation on the side of requiring Vista, California to release the names of 111 employers who use day-laborers. Vista passed an ordinance in June 2006 requiring that employers who use day-laborers register with the city. In June 2007, a member of the Vista Citizens Brigade, said to be an offshoot of the anti-illegal immigration Minutemen Project, filed an open records request with the city of Vista asking for the list of names.

The American Civil Liberties Union filed a request with the court asking that the names be withheld, and a judge granted a temporary restraining order. Subsequently, the CNPA intervened, asking that the names be released.

== Sister organizations ==
- CNPA Services, Inc. was established in July 1992 to accommodate entrepreneurial ventures.
- CNPA Foundation is a nonprofit corporation organized in October 1993 to raise funds through tax deductible contributions for internships and other educational activities for journalism.
