= 2024 California Proposition 32 =

Proposition 32
- Raises Minimum Wage.

Results
Choice	Votes	%
Yes	7,469,803	49.29%
No	7,686,126	50.71%
Valid votes	15,155,929	100.00%
Invalid or blank votes	0	0.00%
Total votes	15,155,929	100.00%
Registered voters/turnout	22,595,659	67.07%

No
90–100%
80–90%
70–80%
60–70%
50–60%
Yes
90–100%
80–90%
70–80%
60–70%
50–60%
- Source: Statement of Vote at the Wayback Machine (archived February 10, 2025)

Proposition 32 was a California ballot proposition that was voted on as part of the 2024 California elections on November 5. The proposition was rejected, with 50.7% of voters voting 'no', but the results remained too close to call for several weeks after election day; the Associated Press called the race on November 20 and CNN had called the race by December 12. If passed, the proposition would have enacted the Living Wage Act of 2022 which would have increased the state's minimum wage to $18 per hour by 2025 and adjusted it every year to reduce the impact of inflation.

== Background ==
US states can set their own minimum wages if they choose to do so, with the federal minimum wage being used if a minimum wage is not set or if it is set below the federal level. In California, the state minimum wage as of January 1, 2024 was $16 per hour. (Note: Some types of worker have a higher minimum wage in California. From April 1, 2024, fast food workers had a minimum wage of $20 per hour and from October 16, 2024, certain healthcare workers had a minimum wage of between $18 and $23.) As of July 2024, California had the highest minimum wage of any state and was the highest in the country except for some part of New York (which also have a $16/hour minimum wage) and the District of Columbia (which has a minimum wage of $17.50/hour). Despite this, California's minimum wage "lags far behind the state's prices"; as of October 2024, the statewide living wage is $27.32 per hour.

The federal minimum wage has remained $7.25/hour since 2009, leading to a movement for a $15 minimum wage during the 2010s. Due to high inflation in the early 2020s and stalemate at the federal level, more focus has been placed on increasing state minimum wages.

=== 2022 proposition attempt ===
The proposition was initially set to be included in the 2022 California elections, but was delayed after the California Secretary of State announced that not enough signatures had been verified for it to qualify. Propositions needed 700,000 signatures to be on the ballot; although the campaign said it had gathered 1,000,000 signatures, because it only submitted them in May, not all the signatures could be verified by the June 30 deadline. Joe Sanberg, the proposition's filer, filed a court case to have the proposition put on the ballot, but this was rejected in July 2022 with the proposition instead confirmed for the 2024 elections.

== Campaign ==
Politico reported in April 2024 that the proposition had been "met so far with shrugs" from unions and business interest groups predominantly because piecemeal industry-by-industry increases to the minimum wage had meant that "it is hard to find anyone who wants to fight over $18".

A survey by the University of Southern California found that people from households earning under $50,000 a year were most likely to support the proposition, and those from households earning over $100,000 were most likely to oppose it.

=== Support ===
Many supporters focused on the rising cost of living. In its endorsement, The Sacramento Bee said it was not ignoring "the concerns of business leaders" but that "too many workers can't afford to live on their wages". The Mercury News and East Bay Times joint endorsement highlighted that $18 is "still not a living wage" for workers in California and "certainly not in the Bay Area."

Proponents disputed the idea that higher minimum wages cause job losses. The Los Angeles Times argued that "higher wages actually make it easier for employers to fill job vacancies and retain workers" and that Proposition 32 was "a reasonable and narrow measure" that focuses on those who "are most in need of a boost". A study from UC Berkeley found that California's increase to a $15 minimum wage had "no significant" effect on unemployment levels.

Saru Jayaraman, president of One Fair Wage, said that opposition campaigning had scared some voters, but that "[n]one of the doom and gloom that they predicted turned out to be true" in the case of the increased minimum wage for fast food workers.

==== Funding ====
Joe Sanberg was a major donor to the proposition during the 2022 cycle, spending $10 million to get it on the ballot. In April 2024, Politico reported that Sanberg had "not raised a dime for the effort in months" and said he was "banking on the inherent appeal" of a higher minimum wage.

In the 2024 cycle, as of 5 November 2024, $948,000 had been raised in support of the proposition. Almost all of this was by Kevin de León, who had raised more than $800,000.

==== Endorsements ====
'Yes'

Statewide officials

- Eleni Kounalakis, lieutenant governor of California (2019–present)
- Tony Thurmond, state superintendent of public instruction of California (2019–present)
- Betty Yee, state controller of California (2015–2023)

State legislators

- Toni Atkins, president pro tempore of the California State Senate (2018–2024), candidate for California governor in 2026

Municipal and local officials

- Dan Kalb, Oakland City Council member (2013–2025)
- Antonio Villaraigosa, mayor of Los Angeles (2005–2013), candidate for California governor in 2026

Newspapers

- Bay Area Reporter
- Los Angeles Times
- The Mercury News/East Bay Times
- The Sacramento Bee
- San Francisco Chronicle

Organizations

- Alice B. Toklas LGBTQ Democratic Club
- American Civil Liberties Union
- California Democratic Party
- California Faculty Association
- California Federation of Labor
- California Federation of Teachers
- California State University Employees Union
- California Teachers Association
- California Young Democrats
- Los Angeles Democratic Socialists of America
- Harvey Milk LGBTQ Democratic Club
- League of Women Voters of California
- NAACP California/Hawaii State Conference
- National Nurses United
- One Fair Wage
- Our Revolution
- Peace and Freedom Party
- SEIU California
- UNITE HERE Local 11
- United Auto Workers
- United Farm Workers
- Working Families Party California

Individuals

- Joe Sanberg, entrepreneur

=== Opposition ===
Opponents argued that a higher minimum wage would lead to increased prices. The San Diego Union-Tribune called on voters to use the proposition "as a referendum on how California is being governed" and argued that "[j]ust as Trumpian tariffs make life more expensive, so do mandatory wage hikes".

High unemployment was also a concern. The Press-Telegram warned that approving Proposition 32 would "make many low-skill workers unemployable". Opponents highlighted surveys commissed by the city of West Hollywood, which had implemented a local minimum wage of $19.08/hour, found that 42% of responding businesses had laid off workers or reduced hours due to higher wages.

==== Funding ====
By early October, the opposition campaign had raised $65,000. The California Growers Association and California Chamber of Commerce had contributed $15,000 each; the California Retailers Association, the National Federation of Independent Business and the Western Growers Service Corporation donated $10,000 each; and the California Restaurant Association had contributed $5,000.

As of 5 November 2024, $855,000 had been raised in opposition to the measure. The largest donor was Western Growers Issues PAC, a political action committee, which had spent $250,000.

==== Endorsements ====
'No'

US representatives

- Doug LaMalfa, US representative for California's 1st congressional district (2013–2026)
- Tom McClintock, US representative for California's 5th congressional district (2009–present)

Newspapers

- The Bakersfield Californian
- The San Diego Union-Tribune
- Southern California News Group (includes the Los Angeles Daily News, The Orange County Register, the Press-Telegram, the Redlands Daily Facts)

Organizations

- California Business Roundtable
- California Chamber of Commerce
- California College Republicans
- California Grocers Association
- California Republican Party
- California Restaurant Association
- Howard Jarvis Taxpayers Association
- National Federation of Independent Business
- San Francisco Chinese American Democratic Club

=== Neutral/No endorsement ===
Neutral/No position

Statewide officials

- Rob Bonta, attorney general of California (2021–present) (Note: Since Bonta writes the ballot titles and summaries in his role as state attorney general, he "doesn't weigh in on most state propositions".)

Organizations

- California Environmental Voters (Note: Politico recorded this organization as "not saying" on Proposition 32)
- California League of Cities
- Equality California (Note: Equality California did not release an endorsement for Proposition 32)
- Planned Parenthood
- Sierra Club

== Polling ==
=== On Proposition 32 ===
Poll source	Date(s) administered	Sample size (Note: Key: A – all adults RV – registered voters LV – likely voters V – unclear)	Margin of error	Yes	No	Undecided
Competitive Edge Research	October 28–30, 2024	517 (RV)	± 4.3%	50%	45%	5%
Berkeley Institute of Governmental Studies	October 22–28, 2024	4341 (LV)	± 2%	47%	39%	14%
Public Policy Institute of California	October 7–15, 2024	1137 (LV)	± 3.7%	44%	54%	2%
Berkeley Institute of Governmental Studies	September 25–October 1, 2024	3045 (LV)	± 2.5%	46%	36%	18%
USC/CSU Long Beach/Cal Poly Pomona	September 12–25, 2024	1,685 (LV)	± 2.4%	43%	41%	16%
Public Policy Institute of California	August 29–September 9, 2024	1071 (LV)	± 3.7%	50%	49%	1%
Berkeley Institute of Governmental Studies	July 31–August 11, 2024	3765 (LV)	± 2%	52%	34%	14%

=== On an $18 minimum wage ===
Poll source	Date(s) administered	Sample size	Margin of error	Favor	Oppose	Undecided
University of Southern California/CSU Long Beach/Cal Poly Pomona (Note: The question put to respondents was "Would you support or oppose a ballot initiative to increase the state minimum wage to $18/hour?")	January 21–29, 2024	1416 (LV)	± 2.6%	59%	34%	8%
Public Policy Institute of California (Note: The question put to respondents was "Do you favor or oppose a policy that would increase the current minimum wage from $15 per hour to $16 in 2024 and subsequently by $1 each year until it reaches $18?")	October 3–19, 2023	1389 (LV)	± 4%	67%	31%	2%

== Results ==
The election was initially characterised as being too close to call, with Politico reporting on 11 November that five million votes remained uncounted mostly in Alameda, Santa Clara, San Francisco and Los Angeles counties. The Associated Press called the election on 20 November, projecting that the proposition had failed. By 12 December, CNN had also called the race.

The official results tallies were released on 13 December 2024 by Shirley Weber, California's Secretary of State. They showed that the proposition had failed, with 7,686,126 people voting no and 7,469,803 people voting yes. The proposition was the first statewide ballot measure raising the minimum wage in the U.S. to be rejected since 1996.

Proposition 32
Choice	Votes	%
For	7,469,803	49.29
Against	7,686,126	50.71
Total	15,155,929	100.00
Registered voters/turnout	22,595,659	67.07

=== Results by city ===
By municipality

Official outcome by city and unincorporated areas of counties, of which Yes won 225 and No won 315.
City	County	Yes		No		Margin		Total Votes	Swing from 2024 Presidential (Harris to "Yes")%
City	County	#	%	#	%	#	%	Total Votes	Swing from 2024 Presidential (Harris to "Yes")%
Alameda	Alameda	24,984	66.42%	12,632	33.58%	12,352	32.84%	37,616	-30.83%
Albany	Alameda	7,051	76.10%	2,214	23.90%	4,837	52.21%	9,265	-26.15%
Berkeley	Alameda	44,961	80.82%	10,668	19.18%	34,293	61.65%	55,629	-23.00%
Dublin	Alameda	14,245	54.58%	11,854	45.42%	2,391	9.16%	26,099	-26.63%
Emeryville	Alameda	3,946	77.68%	1,134	22.32%	2,812	55.35%	5,080	-20.72%
Fremont	Alameda	44,163	55.41%	35,545	44.59%	8,618	10.81%	79,708	-23.24%
Hayward	Alameda	31,937	66.62%	15,999	33.38%	15,938	33.25%	47,936	-8.93%
Livermore	Alameda	20,287	48.36%	21,659	51.64%	-1,372	-3.27%	41,946	-28.01%
Newark	Alameda	9,749	59.59%	6,612	40.41%	3,137	19.17%	16,361	-15.92%
Oakland	Alameda	130,324	78.80%	35,066	21.20%	95,258	57.60%	165,390	-18.62%
Piedmont	Alameda	4,216	59.62%	2,856	40.38%	1,360	19.23%	7,072	-55.56%
Pleasanton	Alameda	17,955	50.21%	17,804	49.79%	151	0.42%	35,759	-34.27%
San Leandro	Alameda	20,419	64.87%	11,056	35.13%	9,363	29.75%	31,475	-15.76%
Union City	Alameda	16,132	63.34%	9,338	36.66%	6,794	26.67%	25,470	-10.26%
Unincorporated Area	Alameda	32,753	58.26%	23,468	41.74%	9,285	16.52%	56,221	-20.79%
Unincorporated Area	Alpine	383	54.02%	326	45.98%	57	8.04%	709	-23.94%
Amador	Amador	58	44.27%	73	55.73%	-15	-11.45%	131	-43.33%
Ione	Amador	686	22.84%	2,317	77.16%	-1,631	-54.31%	3,003	-13.73%
Jackson	Amador	813	32.53%	1,686	67.47%	-873	-34.93%	2,499	-20.23%
Plymouth	Amador	167	26.59%	461	73.41%	-294	-46.82%	628	-19.69%
Sutter Creek	Amador	529	34.53%	1,003	65.47%	-474	-30.94%	1,532	-22.42%
Unincorporated Area	Amador	3,760	27.27%	10,027	72.73%	-6,267	-45.46%	13,787	-15.26%
Biggs	Butte	196	27.88%	507	72.12%	-311	-44.24%	703	-6.32%
Chico	Butte	20,459	47.02%	23,053	52.98%	-2,594	-5.96%	43,512	-29.50%
Gridley	Butte	896	37.54%	1,491	62.46%	-595	-24.93%	2,387	-9.49%
Oroville	Butte	2,213	37.11%	3,751	62.89%	-1,538	-25.79%	5,964	-2.45%
Paradise	Butte	1,635	29.02%	4,000	70.98%	-2,365	-41.97%	5,635	-15.91%
Unincorporated Area	Butte	9,298	27.69%	24,286	72.31%	-14,988	-44.63%	33,584	-15.77%
Angels	Calaveras	602	30.36%	1,381	69.64%	-779	-39.28%	1,983	-17.80%
Unincorporated Area	Calaveras	6,790	28.87%	16,732	71.13%	-9,942	-42.27%	23,522	-13.59%
Colusa	Colusa	697	32.11%	1,474	67.89%	-777	-35.79%	2,171	-8.72%
Williams	Colusa	564	50.09%	562	49.91%	2	0.18%	1,126	-2.05%
Unincorporated Area	Colusa	920	26.60%	2,538	73.40%	-1,618	-46.79%	3,458	-7.99%
Antioch	Contra Costa	26,744	64.13%	14,959	35.87%	11,785	28.26%	41,703	-3.77%
Brentwood	Contra Costa	15,473	49.37%	15,871	50.63%	-398	-1.27%	31,344	-13.71%
Clayton	Contra Costa	3,147	45.33%	3,795	54.67%	-648	-9.33%	6,942	-27.56%
Concord	Contra Costa	29,390	56.99%	22,180	43.01%	7,210	13.98%	51,570	-21.24%
Danville	Contra Costa	11,544	44.74%	14,257	55.26%	-2,713	-10.52%	25,801	-37.25%
El Cerrito	Contra Costa	10,188	74.32%	3,521	25.68%	6,667	48.63%	13,709	-26.88%
Hercules	Contra Costa	7,672	64.60%	4,205	35.40%	3,467	29.19%	11,877	-20.48%
Lafayette	Contra Costa	8,170	53.65%	7,059	46.35%	1,111	7.30%	15,229	-47.82%
Martinez	Contra Costa	10,961	54.64%	9,101	45.36%	1,860	9.27%	20,062	-27.37%
Moraga	Contra Costa	4,849	52.88%	4,320	47.12%	529	5.77%	9,169	-47.55%
Oakley	Contra Costa	9,726	52.45%	8,818	47.55%	908	4.90%	18,544	-2.10%
Orinda	Contra Costa	6,286	52.23%	5,749	47.77%	537	4.46%	12,035	-53.30%
Pinole	Contra Costa	5,495	64.00%	3,091	36.00%	2,404	28.00%	8,586	-16.54%
Pittsburg	Contra Costa	17,108	69.00%	7,686	31.00%	9,422	38.00%	24,794	-0.87%
Pleasant Hill	Contra Costa	10,116	56.03%	7,940	43.97%	2,176	12.05%	18,056	-33.19%
Richmond	Contra Costa	28,519	77.06%	8,490	22.94%	20,029	54.12%	37,009	-9.44%
San Pablo	Contra Costa	5,772	78.86%	1,547	21.14%	4,225	57.73%	7,319	6.58%
San Ramon	Contra Costa	19,851	52.92%	17,661	47.08%	2,190	5.84%	37,512	-27.86%
Walnut Creek	Contra Costa	21,896	56.40%	16,925	43.60%	4,971	12.80%	38,821	-37.33%
Unincorporated Area	Contra Costa	43,757	54.93%	35,909	45.07%	7,848	9.85%	79,666	-19.86%
Crescent City	Del Norte	551	45.61%	657	54.39%	-106	-8.77%	1,208	-7.51%
Unincorporated Area	Del Norte	3,171	35.30%	5,813	64.70%	-2,642	-29.41%	8,984	-10.94%
Placerville	El Dorado	1,869	38.52%	2,983	61.48%	-1,114	-22.96%	4,852	-24.86%
South Lake Tahoe	El Dorado	4,476	52.75%	4,010	47.25%	466	5.49%	8,486	-21.52%
Unincorporated Area	El Dorado	27,395	29.02%	67,015	70.98%	-39,620	-41.97%	94,410	-25.67%
Clovis	Fresno	15,694	29.03%	38,365	70.97%	-22,671	-41.94%	54,059	-21.52%
Coalinga	Fresno	1,436	39.32%	2,216	60.68%	-780	-21.36%	3,652	-3.72%
Firebaugh	Fresno	944	55.59%	754	44.41%	190	11.19%	1,698	-1.18%
Fowler	Fresno	1,055	36.24%	1,856	63.76%	-801	-27.52%	2,911	-17.22%
Fresno	Fresno	70,335	44.61%	87,317	55.39%	-16,982	-10.77%	157,652	-18.98%
Huron	Fresno	452	67.77%	215	32.23%	237	35.53%	667	0.10%
Kerman	Fresno	1,893	43.31%	2,478	56.69%	-585	-13.38%	4,371	-7.57%
Kingsburg	Fresno	1,317	23.19%	4,361	76.81%	-3,044	-53.61%	5,678	-15.98%
Mendota	Fresno	919	62.39%	554	37.61%	365	24.78%	1,473	11.55%
Orange Cove	Fresno	988	60.21%	653	39.79%	335	20.41%	1,641	5.01%
Parlier	Fresno	1,462	59.17%	1,009	40.83%	453	18.33%	2,471	-8.68%
Reedley	Fresno	2,507	37.29%	4,216	62.71%	-1,709	-25.42%	6,723	-19.49%
San Joaquin	Fresno	386	70.96%	158	29.04%	228	41.91%	544	-3.76%
Sanger	Fresno	3,238	42.96%	4,299	57.04%	-1,061	-14.08%	7,537	-20.80%
Selma	Fresno	2,676	42.27%	3,655	57.73%	-979	-15.46%	6,331	-16.02%
Unincorporated Area	Fresno	17,332	28.79%	42,879	71.21%	-25,547	-42.43%	60,211	-18.14%
Orland	Glenn	929	36.33%	1,628	63.67%	-699	-27.34%	2,557	-11.26%
Willows	Glenn	649	31.54%	1,409	68.46%	-760	-36.93%	2,058	-7.41%
Unincorporated Area	Glenn	1,308	23.85%	4,176	76.15%	-2,868	-52.30%	5,484	-6.52%
Arcata	Humboldt	5,876	70.86%	2,416	29.14%	3,460	41.73%	8,292	-25.66%
Blue Lake	Humboldt	381	58.71%	268	41.29%	113	17.41%	649	-30.83%
Eureka	Humboldt	6,589	58.15%	4,743	41.85%	1,846	16.29%	11,332	-22.94%
Ferndale	Humboldt	330	38.33%	531	61.67%	-201	-23.34%	861	-31.30%
Fortuna	Humboldt	1,853	35.42%	3,378	64.58%	-1,525	-29.15%	5,231	-21.80%
Rio Dell	Humboldt	454	35.33%	831	64.67%	-377	-29.34%	1,285	-5.40%
Trinidad	Humboldt	124	58.22%	89	41.78%	35	16.43%	213	-35.97%
Unincorporated Area	Humboldt	16,401	48.32%	17,543	51.68%	-1,142	-3.36%	33,944	-26.01%
Brawley	Imperial	3,853	49.25%	3,971	50.75%	-118	-1.51%	7,824	3.09%
Calexico	Imperial	8,121	68.91%	3,664	31.09%	4,457	37.82%	11,785	20.48%
Calipatria	Imperial	503	57.75%	368	42.25%	135	15.50%	871	17.95%
El Centro	Imperial	7,715	56.53%	5,932	43.47%	1,783	13.07%	13,647	10.09%
Holtville	Imperial	996	55.58%	796	44.42%	200	11.16%	1,792	15.80%
Imperial	Imperial	3,635	46.69%	4,150	53.31%	-515	-6.62%	7,785	10.38%
Westmorland	Imperial	303	62.35%	183	37.65%	120	24.69%	486	9.74%
Unincorporated Area	Imperial	4,128	48.51%	4,381	51.49%	-253	-2.97%	8,509	11.03%
Bishop	Inyo	765	49.71%	774	50.29%	-9	-0.58%	1,539	-15.38%
Unincorporated Area	Inyo	2,650	37.72%	4,375	62.28%	-1,725	-24.56%	7,025	-17.58%
Arvin	Kern	1,699	56.80%	1,292	43.20%	407	13.61%	2,991	-5.98%
Bakersfield	Kern	50,800	37.72%	83,892	62.28%	-33,092	-24.57%	134,692	-9.14%
California City	Kern	1,724	44.23%	2,174	55.77%	-450	-11.54%	3,898	-4.65%
Delano	Kern	4,870	54.46%	4,073	45.54%	797	8.91%	8,943	0.23%
Maricopa	Kern	95	29.69%	225	70.31%	-130	-40.62%	320	27.34%
McFarland	Kern	1,167	51.34%	1,106	48.66%	61	2.68%	2,273	-6.16%
Ridgecrest	Kern	3,262	28.51%	8,180	71.49%	-4,918	-42.98%	11,442	-18.28%
Shafter	Kern	2,274	38.32%	3,661	61.68%	-1,387	-23.37%	5,935	0.30%
Taft	Kern	436	19.70%	1,777	80.30%	-1,341	-60.60%	2,213	2.75%
Tehachapi	Kern	1,053	27.14%	2,827	72.86%	-1,774	-45.72%	3,880	-13.77%
Wasco	Kern	2,078	46.77%	2,365	53.23%	-287	-6.46%	4,443	-1.05%
Unincorporated Area	Kern	29,483	30.82%	66,185	69.18%	-36,702	-38.36%	95,668	-5.44%
Avenal	Kings	790	59.67%	534	40.33%	256	19.34%	1,324	20.38%
Corcoran	Kings	1,357	50.50%	1,330	49.50%	27	1.00%	2,687	3.26%
Hanford	Kings	7,270	35.67%	13,114	64.33%	-5,844	-28.67%	20,384	-7.61%
Lemoore	Kings	3,085	36.66%	5,331	63.34%	-2,246	-26.69%	8,416	-3.70%
Unincorporated Area	Kings	2,253	29.23%	5,456	70.77%	-3,203	-41.55%	7,709	-2.25%
Clearlake	Lake	2,183	54.10%	1,852	45.90%	331	8.20%	4,035	6.64%
Lakeport	Lake	964	43.62%	1,246	56.38%	-282	-12.76%	2,210	-17.66%
Unincorporated Area	Lake	8,525	43.89%	10,900	56.11%	-2,375	-12.23%	19,425	-9.51%
Susanville	Lassen	994	27.29%	2,648	72.71%	-1,654	-45.41%	3,642	0.19%
Unincorporated Area	Lassen	1,446	19.52%	5,962	80.48%	-4,516	-60.96%	7,408	-2.76%
Agoura Hills	Los Angeles	4,884	42.47%	6,615	57.53%	-1,731	-15.05%	11,499	-37.81%
Alhambra	Los Angeles	14,236	51.34%	13,495	48.66%	741	2.67%	27,731	-28.87%
Arcadia	Los Angeles	7,351	35.27%	13,489	64.73%	-6,138	-29.45%	20,840	-40.28%
Artesia	Los Angeles	2,669	50.40%	2,627	49.60%	42	0.79%	5,296	-9.89%
Avalon	Los Angeles	552	51.93%	511	48.07%	41	3.86%	1,063	-9.86%
Azusa	Los Angeles	7,256	49.51%	7,401	50.49%	-145	-0.99%	14,657	-22.23%
Baldwin Park	Los Angeles	10,105	55.85%	7,987	44.15%	2,118	11.71%	18,092	-16.89%
Bell	Los Angeles	4,352	60.45%	2,847	39.55%	1,505	20.91%	7,199	-10.99%
Bell Gardens	Los Angeles	4,952	63.28%	2,874	36.72%	2,078	26.55%	7,826	-7.77%
Bellflower	Los Angeles	12,500	52.60%	11,263	47.40%	1,237	5.21%	23,763	-16.43%
Beverly Hills	Los Angeles	6,054	37.23%	10,207	62.77%	-4,153	-25.54%	16,261	-20.69%
Bradbury	Los Angeles	123	29.22%	298	70.78%	-175	-41.57%	421	-37.97%
Burbank	Los Angeles	26,603	54.86%	21,888	45.14%	4,715	9.72%	48,491	-24.13%
Calabasas	Los Angeles	5,039	41.64%	7,061	58.36%	-2,022	-16.71%	12,100	-34.75%
Carson	Los Angeles	22,067	60.77%	14,244	39.23%	7,823	21.54%	36,311	-20.42%
Cerritos	Los Angeles	9,675	41.36%	13,717	58.64%	-4,042	-17.28%	23,392	-35.69%
Claremont	Los Angeles	8,841	49.85%	8,895	50.15%	-54	-0.30%	17,736	-36.39%
Commerce	Los Angeles	2,279	56.86%	1,729	43.14%	550	13.72%	4,008	-21.58%
Compton	Los Angeles	16,085	69.09%	7,196	30.91%	8,889	38.18%	23,281	-17.49%
Covina	Los Angeles	8,710	43.77%	11,189	56.23%	-2,479	-12.46%	19,899	-25.18%
Cudahy	Los Angeles	2,743	64.82%	1,489	35.18%	1,254	29.63%	4,232	-6.50%
Culver City	Los Angeles	13,391	63.02%	7,858	36.98%	5,533	26.04%	21,249	-38.60%
Diamond Bar	Los Angeles	7,907	36.46%	13,781	63.54%	-5,874	-27.08%	21,688	-34.41%
Downey	Los Angeles	18,474	46.14%	21,562	53.86%	-3,088	-7.71%	40,036	-23.99%
Duarte	Los Angeles	4,409	48.84%	4,619	51.16%	-210	-2.33%	9,028	-27.96%
El Monte	Los Angeles	12,287	55.84%	9,717	44.16%	2,570	11.68%	22,004	-12.01%
El Segundo	Los Angeles	4,084	43.71%	5,259	56.29%	-1,175	-12.58%	9,343	-42.97%
Gardena	Los Angeles	11,890	57.75%	8,698	42.25%	3,192	15.50%	20,588	-27.38%
Glendale	Los Angeles	35,418	51.94%	32,777	48.06%	2,641	3.87%	68,195	-8.54%
Glendora	Los Angeles	8,305	32.84%	16,987	67.16%	-8,682	-34.33%	25,292	-28.87%
Hawaiian Gardens	Los Angeles	2,008	59.16%	1,386	40.84%	622	18.33%	3,394	-8.21%
Hawthorne	Los Angeles	15,802	63.24%	9,186	36.76%	6,616	26.48%	24,988	-18.98%
Hermosa Beach	Los Angeles	4,580	42.68%	6,151	57.32%	-1,571	-14.64%	10,731	-51.90%
Hidden Hills	Los Angeles	324	32.21%	682	67.79%	-358	-35.59%	1,006	-45.28%
Huntington Park	Los Angeles	6,825	62.89%	4,027	37.11%	2,798	25.78%	10,852	-13.29%
Industry	Los Angeles	25	37.31%	42	62.69%	-17	-25.37%	67	-18.23%
Inglewood	Los Angeles	27,110	74.12%	9,467	25.88%	17,643	48.24%	36,577	-19.57%
Irwindale	Los Angeles	303	45.36%	365	54.64%	-62	-9.28%	668	-33.23%
La Canada Flintridge	Los Angeles	4,167	35.77%	7,481	64.23%	-3,314	-28.45%	11,648	-50.50%
La Habra Heights	Los Angeles	813	28.03%	2,087	71.97%	-1,274	-43.93%	2,900	-28.07%
La Mirada	Los Angeles	7,665	36.17%	13,525	63.83%	-5,860	-27.65%	21,190	-28.86%
La Puente	Los Angeles	5,724	55.58%	4,575	44.42%	1,149	11.16%	10,299	-17.13%
La Verne	Los Angeles	5,771	34.76%	10,831	65.24%	-5,060	-30.48%	16,602	-28.20%
Lakewood	Los Angeles	16,155	42.77%	21,621	57.23%	-5,466	-14.47%	37,776	-30.48%
Lancaster	Los Angeles	25,472	48.16%	27,423	51.84%	-1,951	-3.69%	52,895	-12.19%
Lawndale	Los Angeles	5,238	58.12%	3,775	41.88%	1,463	16.23%	9,013	-14.26%
Lomita	Los Angeles	3,432	42.27%	4,688	57.73%	-1,256	-15.47%	8,120	-26.74%
Long Beach	Los Angeles	92,281	55.46%	74,112	44.54%	18,169	10.92%	166,393	-29.27%
Los Angeles	Los Angeles	789,246	60.89%	507,043	39.11%	282,203	21.77%	1,296,289	-21.81%
Lynwood	Los Angeles	8,964	60.50%	5,853	39.50%	3,111	21.00%	14,817	-20.24%
Malibu	Los Angeles	2,696	48.09%	2,910	51.91%	-214	-3.82%	5,606	-31.57%
Manhattan Beach	Los Angeles	7,536	37.35%	12,639	62.65%	-5,103	-25.29%	20,175	-56.57%
Maywood	Los Angeles	3,109	59.90%	2,081	40.10%	1,028	19.81%	5,190	-18.99%
Monrovia	Los Angeles	8,085	47.95%	8,776	52.05%	-691	-4.10%	16,861	-33.49%
Montebello	Los Angeles	10,302	52.38%	9,365	47.62%	937	4.76%	19,667	-27.76%
Monterey Park	Los Angeles	8,157	45.10%	9,928	54.90%	-1,771	-9.79%	18,085	-34.10%
Norwalk	Los Angeles	17,475	52.19%	16,011	47.81%	1,464	4.37%	33,486	-19.33%
Palmdale	Los Angeles	25,486	49.99%	25,497	50.01%	-11	-0.02%	50,983	-14.02%
Palos Verdes Estates	Los Angeles	2,531	30.66%	5,724	69.34%	-3,193	-38.68%	8,255	-49.93%
Paramount	Los Angeles	7,466	59.05%	5,177	40.95%	2,289	18.10%	12,643	-18.32%
Pasadena	Los Angeles	36,365	58.07%	26,261	41.93%	10,104	16.13%	62,626	-36.66%
Pico Rivera	Los Angeles	11,498	52.83%	10,268	47.17%	1,230	5.65%	21,766	-27.12%
Pomona	Los Angeles	21,437	53.00%	19,013	47.00%	2,424	5.99%	40,450	-18.85%
Rancho Palos Verdes	Los Angeles	7,648	33.97%	14,863	66.03%	-7,215	-32.05%	22,511	-45.86%
Redondo Beach	Los Angeles	15,849	44.40%	19,847	55.60%	-3,998	-11.20%	35,696	-45.25%
Rolling Hills	Los Angeles	252	22.38%	874	77.62%	-622	-55.24%	1,126	-40.38%
Rolling Hills Estates	Los Angeles	1,404	29.42%	3,369	70.58%	-1,965	-41.17%	4,773	-49.15%
Rosemead	Los Angeles	5,730	48.77%	6,020	51.23%	-290	-2.47%	11,750	-20.70%
San Dimas	Los Angeles	5,566	33.59%	11,006	66.41%	-5,440	-32.83%	16,572	-29.22%
San Fernando	Los Angeles	3,767	55.87%	2,975	44.13%	792	11.75%	6,742	-22.21%
San Gabriel	Los Angeles	5,135	44.31%	6,454	55.69%	-1,319	-11.38%	11,589	-32.83%
San Marino	Los Angeles	1,844	29.11%	4,491	70.89%	-2,647	-41.78%	6,335	-57.08%
Santa Clarita	Los Angeles	41,867	38.25%	67,582	61.75%	-25,715	-23.49%	109,449	-26.25%
Santa Fe Springs	Los Angeles	3,371	48.68%	3,554	51.32%	-183	-2.64%	6,925	-25.30%
Santa Monica	Los Angeles	29,750	62.21%	18,071	37.79%	11,679	24.42%	47,821	-35.84%
Sierra Madre	Los Angeles	3,131	46.50%	3,602	53.50%	-471	-7.00%	6,733	-43.48%
Signal Hill	Los Angeles	2,594	54.36%	2,178	45.64%	416	8.72%	4,772	-32.94%
South El Monte	Los Angeles	2,537	55.25%	2,055	44.75%	482	10.50%	4,592	-15.03%
South Gate	Los Angeles	13,557	57.91%	9,853	42.09%	3,704	15.82%	23,410	-19.58%
South Pasadena	Los Angeles	7,899	58.16%	5,683	41.84%	2,216	16.32%	13,582	-41.77%
Temple City	Los Angeles	4,689	37.18%	7,923	62.82%	-3,234	-25.64%	12,612	-33.95%
Torrance	Los Angeles	26,473	40.50%	38,894	59.50%	-12,421	-19.00%	65,367	-36.92%
Vernon	Los Angeles	38	56.72%	29	43.28%	9	13.43%	67	-17.34%
Walnut	Los Angeles	4,462	36.39%	7,798	63.61%	-3,336	-27.21%	12,260	-39.03%
West Covina	Los Angeles	18,478	47.48%	20,436	52.52%	-1,958	-5.03%	38,914	-22.67%
West Hollywood	Los Angeles	12,999	67.76%	6,185	32.24%	6,814	35.52%	19,184	-28.76%
Westlake Village	Los Angeles	1,848	37.68%	3,057	62.32%	-1,209	-24.65%	4,905	-39.13%
Whittier	Los Angeles	15,822	43.02%	20,958	56.98%	-5,136	-13.96%	36,780	-30.87%
Unincorporated Area	Los Angeles	171,826	50.74%	166,781	49.26%	5,045	1.49%	338,607	-24.61%
Chowchilla	Madera	1,687	39.43%	2,592	60.57%	-905	-21.15%	4,279	7.48%
Madera	Madera	7,312	47.42%	8,107	52.58%	-795	-5.16%	15,419	-3.53%
Unincorporated Area	Madera	9,974	29.94%	23,341	70.06%	-13,367	-40.12%	33,315	-11.39%
Belvedere	Marin	564	45.19%	684	54.81%	-120	-9.62%	1,248	-59.50%
Corte Madera	Marin	3,468	61.38%	2,182	38.62%	1,286	22.76%	5,650	-45.74%
Fairfax	Marin	3,548	73.84%	1,257	26.16%	2,291	47.68%	4,805	-29.70%
Larkspur	Marin	4,600	62.93%	2,710	37.07%	1,890	25.85%	7,310	-41.07%
Mill Valley	Marin	5,641	66.33%	2,864	33.67%	2,777	32.65%	8,505	-46.16%
Novato	Marin	15,469	57.39%	11,486	42.61%	3,983	14.78%	26,955	-34.89%
Ross	Marin	653	48.84%	684	51.16%	-31	-2.32%	1,337	-61.23%
San Anselmo	Marin	5,353	69.19%	2,384	30.81%	2,969	38.37%	7,737	-37.63%
San Rafael	Marin	16,510	64.30%	9,168	35.70%	7,342	28.59%	25,678	-35.94%
Sausalito	Marin	2,849	63.62%	1,629	36.38%	1,220	27.24%	4,478	-41.72%
Tiburon	Marin	2,799	52.82%	2,500	47.18%	299	5.64%	5,299	-52.16%
Unincorporated Area	Marin	23,826	63.49%	13,704	36.51%	10,122	26.97%	37,530	-38.54%
Unincorporated Area	Mariposa	3,049	33.42%	6,075	66.58%	-3,026	-33.17%	9,124	-12.10%
Fort Bragg	Mendocino	1,699	61.07%	1,083	38.93%	616	22.14%	2,782	-20.40%
Point Arena	Mendocino	134	70.90%	55	29.10%	79	41.80%	189	-17.61%
Ukiah	Mendocino	3,126	53.30%	2,739	46.70%	387	6.60%	5,865	-18.36%
Willits	Mendocino	1,040	55.56%	832	44.44%	208	11.11%	1,872	-9.49%
Unincorporated Area	Mendocino	14,365	53.63%	12,418	46.37%	1,947	7.27%	26,783	-18.54%
Atwater	Merced	4,006	42.56%	5,406	57.44%	-1,400	-14.87%	9,412	-5.76%
Dos Palos	Merced	747	46.98%	843	53.02%	-96	-6.04%	1,590	1.50%
Gustine	Merced	757	41.32%	1,075	58.68%	-318	-17.36%	1,832	-5.82%
Livingston	Merced	2,071	53.13%	1,827	46.87%	244	6.26%	3,898	-0.39%
Los Banos	Merced	6,982	54.05%	5,935	45.95%	1,047	8.11%	12,917	1.30%
Merced	Merced	12,665	49.14%	13,108	50.86%	-443	-1.72%	25,773	-12.00%
Unincorporated Area	Merced	9,427	35.02%	17,489	64.98%	-8,062	-29.95%	26,916	-6.86%
Alturas	Modoc	326	30.58%	740	69.42%	-414	-38.84%	1,066	3.98%
Unincorporated Area	Modoc	685	24.17%	2,149	75.83%	-1,464	-51.66%	2,834	-3.45%
Mammoth Lakes	Mono	1,447	50.24%	1,433	49.76%	14	0.49%	2,880	-35.28%
Unincorporated Area	Mono	1,173	40.16%	1,748	59.84%	-575	-19.69%	2,921	-24.35%
Carmel-by-the-Sea	Monterey	1,150	53.49%	1,000	46.51%	150	6.98%	2,150	-32.61%
Del Rey Oaks	Monterey	536	55.14%	436	44.86%	100	10.29%	972	-23.88%
Gonzales	Monterey	1,255	59.48%	855	40.52%	400	18.96%	2,110	-6.95%
Greenfield	Monterey	2,164	66.28%	1,101	33.72%	1,063	32.56%	3,265	1.37%
King City	Monterey	1,221	54.24%	1,030	45.76%	191	8.49%	2,251	0.04%
Marina	Monterey	5,544	60.50%	3,619	39.50%	1,925	21.01%	9,163	-15.59%
Monterey	Monterey	7,474	60.25%	4,932	39.75%	2,542	20.49%	12,406	-24.94%
Pacific Grove	Monterey	5,303	63.27%	3,078	36.73%	2,225	26.55%	8,381	-29.05%
Salinas	Monterey	23,903	59.62%	16,190	40.38%	7,713	19.24%	40,093	-8.04%
Sand City	Monterey	94	55.95%	74	44.05%	20	11.90%	168	-20.47%
Seaside	Monterey	6,253	62.86%	3,695	37.14%	2,558	25.71%	9,948	-15.07%
Soledad	Monterey	2,829	61.18%	1,795	38.82%	1,034	22.36%	4,624	-2.90%
Unincorporated Area	Monterey	22,687	48.54%	24,047	51.46%	-1,360	-2.91%	46,734	-23.45%
American Canyon	Napa	5,636	61.13%	3,584	38.87%	2,052	22.26%	9,220	-10.75%
Calistoga	Napa	1,247	63.01%	732	36.99%	515	26.02%	1,979	-23.16%
Napa	Napa	19,509	54.58%	16,232	45.42%	3,277	9.17%	35,741	-28.69%
St. Helena	Napa	1,503	54.50%	1,255	45.50%	248	8.99%	2,758	-39.51%
Yountville	Napa	756	57.14%	567	42.86%	189	14.29%	1,323	-29.43%
Unincorporated Area	Napa	5,294	45.12%	6,440	54.88%	-1,146	-9.77%	11,734	-30.19%
Grass Valley	Nevada	3,107	47.73%	3,403	52.27%	-296	-4.55%	6,510	-22.53%
Nevada City	Nevada	1,218	61.83%	752	38.17%	466	23.65%	1,970	-26.56%
Truckee	Nevada	4,768	52.44%	4,324	47.56%	444	4.88%	9,092	-46.61%
Unincorporated Area	Nevada	15,461	36.52%	26,880	63.48%	-11,419	-26.97%	42,341	-27.99%
Aliso Viejo	Orange	9,915	40.23%	14,730	59.77%	-4,815	-19.54%	24,645	-28.14%
Anaheim	Orange	49,436	44.33%	62,087	55.67%	-12,651	-11.34%	111,523	-20.42%
Brea	Orange	7,337	32.36%	15,339	67.64%	-8,002	-35.29%	22,676	-33.99%
Buena Park	Orange	12,791	43.16%	16,845	56.84%	-4,054	-13.68%	29,636	-18.69%
Costa Mesa	Orange	18,912	40.39%	27,909	59.61%	-8,997	-19.22%	46,821	-24.44%
Cypress	Orange	8,449	36.27%	14,843	63.73%	-6,394	-27.45%	23,292	-30.47%
Dana Point	Orange	6,236	32.67%	12,850	67.33%	-6,614	-34.65%	19,086	-28.07%
Fountain Valley	Orange	10,197	36.09%	18,056	63.91%	-7,859	-27.82%	28,253	-22.72%
Fullerton	Orange	22,215	39.64%	33,824	60.36%	-11,609	-20.72%	56,039	-31.20%
Garden Grove	Orange	27,670	46.38%	31,984	53.62%	-4,314	-7.23%	59,654	-4.62%
Huntington Beach	Orange	34,717	33.09%	70,196	66.91%	-35,479	-33.82%	104,913	-25.00%
Irvine	Orange	51,576	44.58%	64,126	55.42%	-12,550	-10.85%	115,702	-32.29%
La Habra	Orange	9,047	38.64%	14,364	61.36%	-5,317	-22.71%	23,411	-26.94%
La Palma	Orange	2,585	36.29%	4,538	63.71%	-1,953	-27.42%	7,123	-35.19%
Laguna Beach	Orange	6,293	44.13%	7,967	55.87%	-1,674	-11.74%	14,260	-37.08%
Laguna Hills	Orange	5,430	35.20%	9,995	64.80%	-4,565	-29.59%	15,425	-29.61%
Laguna Niguel	Orange	12,682	35.49%	23,052	64.51%	-10,370	-29.02%	35,734	-29.04%
Laguna Woods	Orange	5,582	44.65%	6,920	55.35%	-1,338	-10.70%	12,502	-26.66%
Lake Forest	Orange	15,383	36.97%	26,229	63.03%	-10,846	-26.06%	41,612	-29.70%
Los Alamitos	Orange	2,088	36.73%	3,596	63.27%	-1,508	-26.53%	5,684	-27.28%
Mission Viejo	Orange	17,077	33.00%	34,669	67.00%	-17,592	-34.00%	51,746	-32.99%
Newport Beach	Orange	13,397	27.65%	35,051	72.35%	-21,654	-44.70%	48,448	-27.80%
Orange	Orange	21,640	36.73%	37,279	63.27%	-15,639	-26.54%	58,919	-29.54%
Placentia	Orange	8,686	35.33%	15,902	64.67%	-7,216	-29.35%	24,588	-29.64%
Rancho Santa Margarita	Orange	8,045	32.46%	16,737	67.54%	-8,692	-35.07%	24,782	-30.85%
San Clemente	Orange	11,028	30.05%	25,670	69.95%	-14,642	-39.90%	36,698	-26.19%
San Juan Capistrano	Orange	5,936	33.18%	11,956	66.82%	-6,020	-33.65%	17,892	-25.71%
Santa Ana	Orange	41,518	53.32%	36,353	46.68%	5,165	6.63%	77,871	-17.11%
Seal Beach	Orange	5,413	34.38%	10,330	65.62%	-4,917	-31.23%	15,743	-36.56%
Stanton	Orange	5,539	50.26%	5,481	49.74%	58	0.53%	11,020	-5.07%
Tustin	Orange	13,025	42.72%	17,466	57.28%	-4,441	-14.56%	30,491	-30.13%
Villa Park	Orange	793	20.73%	3,033	79.27%	-2,240	-58.55%	3,826	-32.32%
Westminster	Orange	15,378	43.84%	19,698	56.16%	-4,320	-12.32%	35,076	-3.35%
Yorba Linda	Orange	9,280	23.98%	29,416	76.02%	-20,136	-52.04%	38,696	-30.75%
Unincorporated Area	Orange	21,524	31.24%	47,366	68.76%	-25,842	-37.51%	68,890	-29.98%
Auburn	Placer	2,732	34.35%	5,222	65.65%	-2,490	-31.31%	7,954	-33.85%
Colfax	Placer	292	32.37%	610	67.63%	-318	-35.25%	902	-16.27%
Lincoln	Placer	9,109	29.46%	21,807	70.54%	-12,698	-41.07%	30,916	-30.49%
Loomis	Placer	839	20.83%	3,189	79.17%	-2,350	-58.34%	4,028	-24.87%
Rocklin	Placer	11,447	30.80%	25,723	69.20%	-14,276	-38.41%	37,170	-31.84%
Roseville	Placer	26,617	33.56%	52,694	66.44%	-26,077	-32.88%	79,311	-30.21%
Unincorporated Area	Placer	18,418	27.69%	48,101	72.31%	-29,683	-44.62%	66,519	-29.34%
Portola	Plumas	346	42.61%	466	57.39%	-120	-14.78%	812	3.39%
Unincorporated Area	Plumas	2,896	32.37%	6,051	67.63%	-3,155	-35.26%	8,947	-18.44%
Banning	Riverside	5,482	45.47%	6,574	54.53%	-1,092	-9.06%	12,056	-5.63%
Beaumont	Riverside	10,125	42.15%	13,896	57.85%	-3,771	-15.70%	24,021	-7.02%
Blythe	Riverside	1,406	41.76%	1,961	58.24%	-555	-16.48%	3,367	3.25%
Calimesa	Riverside	1,761	31.04%	3,913	68.96%	-2,152	-37.93%	5,674	-6.59%
Canyon Lake	Riverside	1,469	22.27%	5,127	77.73%	-3,658	-55.46%	6,596	0.49%
Cathedral City	Riverside	11,666	62.55%	6,985	37.45%	4,681	25.10%	18,651	-11.89%
Coachella	Riverside	5,715	64.48%	3,148	35.52%	2,567	28.96%	8,863	2.12%
Corona	Riverside	25,585	41.51%	36,048	58.49%	-10,463	-16.98%	61,633	-10.91%
Desert Hot Springs	Riverside	5,005	61.40%	3,147	38.60%	1,858	22.79%	8,152	6.64%
Eastvale	Riverside	11,436	42.83%	15,262	57.17%	-3,826	-14.33%	26,698	-10.03%
Hemet	Riverside	13,813	46.96%	15,602	53.04%	-1,789	-6.08%	29,415	-0.96%
Indian Wells	Riverside	981	35.25%	1,802	64.75%	-821	-29.50%	2,783	-16.84%
Indio	Riverside	14,770	49.30%	15,188	50.70%	-418	-1.40%	29,958	-10.07%
Jurupa Valley	Riverside	14,486	46.00%	17,002	54.00%	-2,516	-7.99%	31,488	-6.49%
La Quinta	Riverside	8,278	43.24%	10,866	56.76%	-2,588	-13.52%	19,144	-13.92%
Lake Elsinore	Riverside	11,895	46.35%	13,770	53.65%	-1,875	-7.31%	25,665	1.23%
Menifee	Riverside	21,428	41.22%	30,562	58.78%	-9,134	-17.57%	51,990	-4.72%
Moreno Valley	Riverside	33,283	55.59%	26,592	44.41%	6,691	11.17%	59,875	-6.94%
Murrieta	Riverside	18,040	36.69%	31,131	63.31%	-13,091	-26.62%	49,171	-8.66%
Norco	Riverside	2,876	25.55%	8,380	74.45%	-5,504	-48.90%	11,256	-5.46%
Palm Desert	Riverside	12,291	48.04%	13,296	51.96%	-1,005	-3.93%	25,587	-13.11%
Palm Springs	Riverside	16,054	67.82%	7,616	32.18%	8,438	35.65%	23,670	-25.68%
Perris	Riverside	11,330	58.83%	7,930	41.17%	3,400	17.65%	19,260	-1.12%
Rancho Mirage	Riverside	5,732	50.67%	5,581	49.33%	151	1.33%	11,313	-25.47%
Riverside	Riverside	49,638	47.06%	55,844	52.94%	-6,206	-5.88%	105,482	-13.11%
San Jacinto	Riverside	7,481	49.00%	7,787	51.00%	-306	-2.00%	15,268	1.55%
Temecula	Riverside	19,328	38.01%	31,519	61.99%	-12,191	-23.98%	50,847	-13.64%
Wildomar	Riverside	5,734	36.64%	9,914	63.36%	-4,180	-26.71%	15,648	-1.03%
Unincorporated Area	Riverside	63,419	40.84%	91,875	59.16%	-28,456	-18.32%	155,294	-6.37%
Citrus Heights	Sacramento	14,988	40.05%	22,432	59.95%	-7,444	-19.89%	37,420	-13.81%
Elk Grove	Sacramento	37,662	47.42%	41,763	52.58%	-4,101	-5.16%	79,425	-23.59%
Folsom	Sacramento	16,032	37.28%	26,971	62.72%	-10,939	-25.44%	43,003	-31.84%
Galt	Sacramento	4,032	37.29%	6,782	62.71%	-2,750	-25.43%	10,814	-7.61%
Isleton	Sacramento	119	44.74%	147	55.26%	-28	-10.53%	266	-14.83%
Rancho Cordova	Sacramento	14,640	46.61%	16,769	53.39%	-2,129	-6.78%	31,409	-18.04%
Sacramento	Sacramento	116,677	59.59%	79,108	40.41%	37,569	19.19%	195,785	-26.37%
Unincorporated Area	Sacramento	106,056	44.55%	132,025	55.45%	-25,969	-10.91%	238,081	-19.03%
Hollister	San Benito	8,949	56.82%	6,802	43.18%	2,147	13.63%	15,751	-7.51%
San Juan Bautista	San Benito	585	55.56%	468	44.44%	117	11.11%	1,053	-20.79%
Unincorporated Area	San Benito	4,404	42.54%	5,949	57.46%	-1,545	-14.92%	10,353	-12.44%
Adelanto	San Bernardino	4,627	61.25%	2,927	38.75%	1,700	22.50%	7,554	11.43%
Apple Valley	San Bernardino	10,267	34.88%	19,167	65.12%	-8,900	-30.24%	29,434	-1.81%
Barstow	San Bernardino	2,639	46.47%	3,040	53.53%	-401	-7.06%	5,679	6.78%
Big Bear Lake	San Bernardino	733	36.78%	1,260	63.22%	-527	-26.44%	1,993	-9.78%
Chino	San Bernardino	13,509	40.57%	19,787	59.43%	-6,278	-18.86%	33,296	-16.32%
Chino Hills	San Bernardino	12,056	36.25%	21,200	63.75%	-9,144	-27.50%	33,256	-23.03%
Colton	San Bernardino	7,492	53.84%	6,423	46.16%	1,069	7.68%	13,915	-10.05%
Fontana	San Bernardino	33,858	50.99%	32,541	49.01%	1,317	1.98%	66,399	-10.39%
Grand Terrace	San Bernardino	2,145	40.40%	3,164	59.60%	-1,019	-19.19%	5,309	-14.96%
Hesperia	San Bernardino	12,708	41.86%	17,650	58.14%	-4,942	-16.28%	30,358	7.04%
Highland	San Bernardino	7,929	44.04%	10,074	55.96%	-2,145	-11.91%	18,003	-9.66%
Loma Linda	San Bernardino	4,364	49.78%	4,402	50.22%	-38	-0.43%	8,766	-11.77%
Montclair	San Bernardino	5,395	52.89%	4,805	47.11%	590	5.78%	10,200	-12.07%
Needles	San Bernardino	611	46.39%	706	53.61%	-95	-7.21%	1,317	12.85%
Ontario	San Bernardino	26,491	49.06%	27,507	50.94%	-1,016	-1.88%	53,998	-13.24%
Rancho Cucamonga	San Bernardino	28,924	39.33%	44,619	60.67%	-15,695	-21.34%	73,543	-17.54%
Redlands	San Bernardino	13,585	41.61%	19,061	58.39%	-5,476	-16.77%	32,646	-22.59%
Rialto	San Bernardino	16,070	55.13%	13,081	44.87%	2,989	10.25%	29,151	-10.05%
San Bernardino	San Bernardino	27,040	54.40%	22,670	45.60%	4,370	8.79%	49,710	-5.38%
Twentynine Palms	San Bernardino	2,430	49.22%	2,507	50.78%	-77	-1.56%	4,937	7.77%
Upland	San Bernardino	13,350	39.78%	20,206	60.22%	-6,856	-20.43%	33,556	-20.95%
Victorville	San Bernardino	19,106	53.78%	16,419	46.22%	2,687	7.56%	35,525	4.74%
Yucaipa	San Bernardino	7,108	28.49%	17,841	71.51%	-10,733	-43.02%	24,949	-8.34%
Yucca Valley	San Bernardino	3,602	42.15%	4,944	57.85%	-1,342	-15.70%	8,546	4.60%
Unincorporated Area	San Bernardino	39,416	39.41%	60,599	60.59%	-21,183	-21.18%	100,015	-2.86%
Carlsbad	San Diego	26,854	40.27%	39,835	59.73%	-12,981	-19.46%	66,689	-36.44%
Chula Vista	San Diego	58,577	52.16%	53,730	47.84%	4,847	4.32%	112,307	-12.57%
Coronado	San Diego	3,134	34.93%	5,837	65.07%	-2,703	-30.13%	8,971	-37.18%
Del Mar	San Diego	1,155	43.36%	1,509	56.64%	-354	-13.29%	2,664	-40.59%
El Cajon	San Diego	15,045	44.36%	18,870	55.64%	-3,825	-11.28%	33,915	2.13%
Encinitas	San Diego	16,779	45.65%	19,980	54.35%	-3,201	-8.71%	36,759	-40.69%
Escondido	San Diego	24,015	44.38%	30,096	55.62%	-6,081	-11.24%	54,111	-18.59%
Imperial Beach	San Diego	4,546	51.44%	4,292	48.56%	254	2.87%	8,838	-2.16%
La Mesa	San Diego	14,029	49.03%	14,587	50.97%	-558	-1.95%	28,616	-28.99%
Lemon Grove	San Diego	5,620	53.12%	4,960	46.88%	660	6.24%	10,580	-15.14%
National City	San Diego	10,129	64.06%	5,682	35.94%	4,447	28.13%	15,811	9.76%
Oceanside	San Diego	36,013	44.96%	44,093	55.04%	-8,080	-10.09%	80,106	-21.41%
Poway	San Diego	9,303	35.39%	16,985	64.61%	-7,682	-29.22%	26,288	-34.22%
San Diego	San Diego	306,308	52.15%	281,048	47.85%	25,260	4.30%	587,356	-29.33%
San Marcos	San Diego	17,785	43.69%	22,925	56.31%	-5,140	-12.63%	40,710	-25.71%
Santee	San Diego	9,827	33.71%	19,323	66.29%	-9,496	-32.58%	29,150	-20.23%
Solana Beach	San Diego	3,476	44.56%	4,325	55.44%	-849	-10.88%	7,801	-41.25%
Vista	San Diego	17,178	46.12%	20,072	53.88%	-2,894	-7.77%	37,250	-18.33%
Unincorporated Area	San Diego	81,958	34.81%	153,454	65.19%	-71,496	-30.37%	235,412	-16.21%
San Francisco	San Francisco	271,306	70.98%	110,945	29.02%	160,361	41.95%	382,251	-22.85%
Escalon	San Joaquin	861	25.13%	2,565	74.87%	-1,704	-49.74%	3,426	-11.63%
Lathrop	San Joaquin	6,272	54.85%	5,162	45.15%	1,110	9.71%	11,434	0.12%
Lodi	San Joaquin	8,269	32.68%	17,034	67.32%	-8,765	-34.64%	25,303	-15.68%
Manteca	San Joaquin	14,159	43.17%	18,643	56.83%	-4,484	-13.67%	32,802	-8.06%
Ripon	San Joaquin	1,776	22.03%	6,287	77.97%	-4,511	-55.95%	8,063	-17.10%
Stockton	San Joaquin	45,053	52.46%	40,830	47.54%	4,223	4.92%	85,883	-11.74%
Tracy	San Joaquin	16,177	50.04%	16,152	49.96%	25	0.08%	32,329	-10.03%
Mountain House	San Joaquin	4,327	58.32%	3,093	41.68%	1,234	16.63%	7,420	1.79%
Unincorporated Area	San Joaquin	14,661	31.58%	31,758	68.42%	-17,097	-36.83%	46,419	-12.72%
Arroyo Grande	San Luis Obispo	3,930	37.19%	6,638	62.81%	-2,708	-25.62%	10,568	-34.79%
Atascadero	San Luis Obispo	5,788	36.11%	10,243	63.89%	-4,455	-27.79%	16,031	-28.31%
El Paso de Robles	San Luis Obispo	5,015	35.66%	9,048	64.34%	-4,033	-28.68%	14,063	-24.11%
Grover Beach	San Luis Obispo	2,484	40.88%	3,593	59.12%	-1,109	-18.25%	6,077	-28.76%
Morro Bay	San Luis Obispo	3,033	46.19%	3,533	53.81%	-500	-7.61%	6,566	-34.62%
Pismo Beach	San Luis Obispo	1,770	34.34%	3,385	65.66%	-1,615	-31.33%	5,155	-38.80%
San Luis Obispo	San Luis Obispo	12,501	53.94%	10,675	46.06%	1,826	7.88%	23,176	-41.12%
Unincorporated Area	San Luis Obispo	23,332	36.79%	40,092	63.21%	-16,760	-26.43%	63,424	-28.09%
Atherton	San Mateo	1,579	42.48%	2,138	57.52%	-559	-15.04%	3,717	-58.72%
Belmont	San Mateo	7,100	53.84%	6,088	46.16%	1,012	7.67%	13,188	-47.92%
Brisbane	San Mateo	1,383	62.10%	844	37.90%	539	24.20%	2,227	-32.05%
Burlingame	San Mateo	7,689	53.07%	6,800	46.93%	889	6.14%	14,489	-45.02%
Colma	San Mateo	356	63.80%	202	36.20%	154	27.60%	558	-18.06%
Daly City	San Mateo	20,277	63.87%	11,469	36.13%	8,808	27.75%	31,746	-14.32%
East Palo Alto	San Mateo	4,719	74.89%	1,582	25.11%	3,137	49.79%	6,301	-7.92%
Foster City	San Mateo	6,982	51.75%	6,511	48.25%	471	3.49%	13,493	-43.87%
Half Moon Bay	San Mateo	3,514	57.57%	2,590	42.43%	924	15.14%	6,104	-35.65%
Hillsborough	San Mateo	2,209	35.83%	3,957	64.17%	-1,748	-28.35%	6,166	-62.81%
Menlo Park	San Mateo	9,302	59.74%	6,269	40.26%	3,033	19.48%	15,571	-45.88%
Millbrae	San Mateo	4,869	47.98%	5,280	52.02%	-411	-4.05%	10,149	-34.46%
Pacifica	San Mateo	11,765	59.47%	8,018	40.53%	3,747	18.94%	19,783	-29.94%
Portola Valley	San Mateo	1,513	51.64%	1,417	48.36%	96	3.28%	2,930	-58.45%
Redwood City	San Mateo	19,509	59.50%	13,281	40.50%	6,228	18.99%	32,790	-37.35%
San Bruno	San Mateo	10,159	58.28%	7,271	41.72%	2,888	16.57%	17,430	-23.51%
San Carlos	San Mateo	9,063	54.10%	7,690	45.90%	1,373	8.20%	16,753	-50.78%
San Mateo	San Mateo	24,003	56.01%	18,851	43.99%	5,152	12.02%	42,854	-40.32%
South San Francisco	San Mateo	14,733	59.47%	10,041	40.53%	4,692	18.94%	24,774	-24.51%
Woodside	San Mateo	1,594	47.31%	1,775	52.69%	-181	-5.37%	3,369	-52.91%
Unincorporated Area	San Mateo	16,952	57.89%	12,333	42.11%	4,619	15.77%	29,285	-40.67%
Buellton	Santa Barbara	1,087	40.10%	1,624	59.90%	-537	-19.81%	2,711	-29.11%
Carpinteria	Santa Barbara	3,440	54.83%	2,834	45.17%	606	9.66%	6,274	-32.42%
Goleta	Santa Barbara	8,532	54.67%	7,073	45.33%	1,459	9.35%	15,605	-32.98%
Guadalupe	Santa Barbara	1,037	49.74%	1,048	50.26%	-11	-0.53%	2,085	-14.32%
Lompoc	Santa Barbara	6,046	46.32%	7,007	53.68%	-961	-7.36%	13,053	-15.09%
Santa Barbara	Santa Barbara	25,832	62.18%	15,713	37.82%	10,119	24.36%	41,545	-31.75%
Santa Maria	Santa Barbara	11,838	46.54%	13,598	53.46%	-1,760	-6.92%	25,436	-8.46%
Solvang	Santa Barbara	1,327	42.15%	1,821	57.85%	-494	-15.69%	3,148	-25.33%
Unincorporated Area	Santa Barbara	30,356	45.40%	36,506	54.60%	-6,150	-9.20%	66,862	-27.45%
Campbell	Santa Clara	10,861	56.54%	8,347	43.46%	2,514	13.09%	19,208	-31.90%
Cupertino	Santa Clara	12,634	52.35%	11,498	47.65%	1,136	4.71%	24,132	-39.50%
Gilroy	Santa Clara	12,665	55.84%	10,017	44.16%	2,648	11.67%	22,682	-14.96%
Los Altos	Santa Clara	9,245	53.19%	8,137	46.81%	1,108	6.37%	17,382	-52.44%
Los Altos Hills	Santa Clara	2,347	47.44%	2,600	52.56%	-253	-5.11%	4,947	-51.09%
Los Gatos	Santa Clara	9,367	53.11%	8,271	46.89%	1,096	6.21%	17,638	-38.31%
Milpitas	Santa Clara	14,570	59.05%	10,102	40.95%	4,468	18.11%	24,672	-8.49%
Monte Sereno	Santa Clara	1,005	46.38%	1,162	53.62%	-157	-7.25%	2,167	-41.28%
Morgan Hill	Santa Clara	11,113	51.59%	10,430	48.41%	683	3.17%	21,543	-23.35%
Mountain View	Santa Clara	18,721	61.36%	11,789	38.64%	6,932	22.72%	30,510	-39.48%
Palo Alto	Santa Clara	19,502	60.36%	12,810	39.64%	6,692	20.71%	32,312	-43.69%
San Jose	Santa Clara	210,512	59.33%	144,320	40.67%	66,192	18.65%	354,832	-17.21%
Santa Clara	Santa Clara	24,657	60.07%	16,388	39.93%	8,269	20.15%	41,045	-21.34%
Saratoga	Santa Clara	8,001	46.45%	9,224	53.55%	-1,223	-7.10%	17,225	-48.30%
Sunnyvale	Santa Clara	30,081	59.32%	20,626	40.68%	9,455	18.65%	50,707	-29.80%
Unincorporated Area	Santa Clara	18,389	53.92%	15,713	46.08%	2,676	7.85%	34,102	-24.73%
Capitola	Santa Cruz	3,275	59.99%	2,184	40.01%	1,091	19.99%	5,459	-34.95%
Santa Cruz	Santa Cruz	21,415	71.24%	8,647	28.76%	12,768	42.47%	30,062	-29.81%
Scotts Valley	Santa Cruz	3,635	51.95%	3,362	48.05%	273	3.90%	6,997	-39.00%
Watsonville	Santa Cruz	9,075	65.23%	4,837	34.77%	4,238	30.46%	13,912	-13.40%
Unincorporated Area	Santa Cruz	42,513	58.53%	30,125	41.47%	12,388	17.05%	72,638	-33.07%
Anderson	Shasta	1,114	26.61%	3,072	73.39%	-1,958	-46.77%	4,186	-6.47%
Redding	Shasta	11,476	27.09%	30,884	72.91%	-19,408	-45.82%	42,360	-17.17%
Shasta Lake	Shasta	1,273	28.27%	3,230	71.73%	-1,957	-43.46%	4,503	-9.05%
Unincorporated Area	Shasta	7,356	21.63%	26,646	78.37%	-19,290	-56.73%	34,002	-10.64%
Loyalton	Sierra	101	30.51%	230	69.49%	-129	-38.97%	331	3.01%
Unincorporated Area	Sierra	477	34.69%	898	65.31%	-421	-30.62%	1,375	-10.70%
Dorris	Siskiyou	82	34.45%	156	65.55%	-74	-31.09%	238	10.78%
Dunsmuir	Siskiyou	366	53.28%	321	46.72%	45	6.55%	687	-15.08%
Etna	Siskiyou	104	31.61%	225	68.39%	-121	-36.78%	329	-8.16%
Fort Jones	Siskiyou	102	35.29%	187	64.71%	-85	-29.41%	289	1.05%
Montague	Siskiyou	158	26.29%	443	73.71%	-285	-47.42%	601	-3.91%
Mt. Shasta	Siskiyou	892	50.77%	865	49.23%	27	1.54%	1,757	-18.53%
Tulelake	Siskiyou	58	41.43%	82	58.57%	-24	-17.14%	140	8.04%
Weed	Siskiyou	403	48.15%	434	51.85%	-31	-3.70%	837	-1.04%
Yreka	Siskiyou	1,054	33.80%	2,064	66.20%	-1,010	-32.39%	3,118	-7.42%
Unincorporated Area	Siskiyou	4,082	32.28%	8,564	67.72%	-4,482	-35.44%	12,646	-10.84%
Benicia	Solano	8,035	50.66%	7,825	49.34%	210	1.32%	15,860	-36.48%
Dixon	Solano	3,560	38.24%	5,750	61.76%	-2,190	-23.52%	9,310	-18.63%
Fairfield	Solano	24,362	54.87%	20,034	45.13%	4,328	9.75%	44,396	-16.82%
Rio Vista	Solano	3,077	47.63%	3,383	52.37%	-306	-4.74%	6,460	-26.53%
Suisun City	Solano	6,558	60.24%	4,328	39.76%	2,230	20.49%	10,886	-10.97%
Vacaville	Solano	18,131	41.80%	25,244	58.20%	-7,113	-16.40%	43,375	-18.52%
Vallejo	Solano	29,700	66.43%	15,012	33.57%	14,688	32.85%	44,712	-12.82%
Unincorporated Area	Solano	2,963	32.56%	6,137	67.44%	-3,174	-34.88%	9,100	-21.43%
Cloverdale	Sonoma	2,068	51.47%	1,950	48.53%	118	2.94%	4,018	-27.54%
Cotati	Sonoma	2,227	58.42%	1,585	41.58%	642	16.84%	3,812	-28.47%
Healdsburg	Sonoma	3,549	59.42%	2,424	40.58%	1,125	18.83%	5,973	-38.70%
Petaluma	Sonoma	19,462	59.49%	13,252	40.51%	6,210	18.98%	32,714	-30.79%
Rohnert Park	Sonoma	11,592	57.07%	8,719	42.93%	2,873	14.15%	20,311	-22.43%
Santa Rosa	Sonoma	47,449	59.76%	31,950	40.24%	15,499	19.52%	79,399	-29.46%
Sebastopol	Sonoma	3,274	72.55%	1,239	27.45%	2,035	45.09%	4,513	-24.78%
Sonoma	Sonoma	3,768	59.64%	2,550	40.36%	1,218	19.28%	6,318	-34.72%
Windsor	Sonoma	6,415	47.70%	7,034	52.30%	-619	-4.60%	13,449	-35.59%
Unincorporated Area	Sonoma	40,686	57.25%	30,382	42.75%	10,304	14.50%	71,068	-30.36%
Ceres	Stanislaus	7,146	49.71%	7,228	50.29%	-82	-0.57%	14,374	0.71%
Hughson	Stanislaus	935	28.53%	2,342	71.47%	-1,407	-42.94%	3,277	-10.22%
Modesto	Stanislaus	33,435	44.53%	41,655	55.47%	-8,220	-10.95%	75,090	-9.53%
Newman	Stanislaus	1,735	47.40%	1,925	52.60%	-190	-5.19%	3,660	-2.18%
Oakdale	Stanislaus	3,210	31.79%	6,887	68.21%	-3,677	-36.42%	10,097	-2.20%
Patterson	Stanislaus	4,624	59.05%	3,207	40.95%	1,417	18.09%	7,831	2.36%
Riverbank	Stanislaus	3,714	41.03%	5,337	58.97%	-1,623	-17.93%	9,051	-7.33%
Turlock	Stanislaus	10,065	37.81%	16,556	62.19%	-6,491	-24.38%	26,621	-8.89%
Waterford	Stanislaus	1,130	36.17%	1,994	63.83%	-864	-27.66%	3,124	3.64%
Unincorporated Area	Stanislaus	12,301	33.17%	24,780	66.83%	-12,479	-33.65%	37,081	-6.18%
Live Oak	Sutter	1,273	41.70%	1,780	58.30%	-507	-16.61%	3,053	0.73%
Yuba City	Sutter	8,580	34.22%	16,496	65.78%	-7,916	-31.57%	25,076	-5.25%
Unincorporated Area	Sutter	1,960	20.30%	7,693	79.70%	-5,733	-59.39%	9,653	-9.86%
Corning	Tehama	676	35.25%	1,242	64.75%	-566	-29.51%	1,918	-7.24%
Red Bluff	Tehama	1,640	33.65%	3,233	66.35%	-1,593	-32.69%	4,873	-2.60%
Tehama	Tehama	53	27.89%	137	72.11%	-84	-44.21%	190	-18.82%
Unincorporated Area	Tehama	4,333	23.16%	14,374	76.84%	-10,041	-53.68%	18,707	-6.58%
Unincorporated Area	Trinity	1,981	36.32%	3,473	63.68%	-1,492	-27.36%	5,454	-17.97%
Dinuba	Tulare	2,371	42.08%	3,263	57.92%	-892	-15.83%	5,634	-10.25%
Exeter	Tulare	998	27.12%	2,682	72.88%	-1,684	-45.76%	3,680	-8.36%
Farmersville	Tulare	1,043	52.25%	953	47.75%	90	4.51%	1,996	-0.41%
Lindsay	Tulare	1,106	51.75%	1,031	48.25%	75	3.51%	2,137	-6.42%
Porterville	Tulare	6,042	41.46%	8,532	58.54%	-2,490	-17.09%	14,574	-3.21%
Tulare	Tulare	7,065	35.62%	12,767	64.38%	-5,702	-28.75%	19,832	-5.61%
Visalia	Tulare	16,922	32.95%	34,429	67.05%	-17,507	-34.09%	51,351	-14.36%
Woodlake	Tulare	752	47.72%	824	52.28%	-72	-4.57%	1,576	-16.16%
Unincorporated Area	Tulare	10,664	31.87%	22,800	68.13%	-12,136	-36.27%	33,464	-6.77%
Sonora	Tuolumne	920	40.71%	1,340	59.29%	-420	-18.58%	2,260	-16.49%
Unincorporated Area	Tuolumne	7,995	31.13%	17,686	68.87%	-9,691	-37.74%	25,681	-14.12%
Camarillo	Ventura	14,861	39.65%	22,623	60.35%	-7,762	-20.71%	37,484	-29.12%
Fillmore	Ventura	3,036	49.20%	3,135	50.80%	-99	-1.60%	6,171	-11.51%
Moorpark	Ventura	7,222	40.16%	10,762	59.84%	-3,540	-19.68%	17,984	-28.70%
Ojai	Ventura	2,668	61.89%	1,643	38.11%	1,025	23.78%	4,311	-19.75%
Oxnard	Ventura	33,428	57.35%	24,856	42.65%	8,572	14.71%	58,284	-17.40%
Port Hueneme	Ventura	3,953	55.40%	3,182	44.60%	771	10.81%	7,135	-15.31%
San Buenaventura	Ventura	27,717	50.77%	26,880	49.23%	837	1.53%	54,597	-24.29%
Santa Paula	Ventura	5,254	52.48%	4,757	47.52%	497	4.96%	10,011	-16.75%
Simi Valley	Ventura	24,363	38.44%	39,021	61.56%	-14,658	-23.13%	63,384	-18.97%
Thousand Oaks	Ventura	28,748	42.23%	39,320	57.77%	-10,572	-15.53%	68,068	-28.73%
Unincorporated Area	Ventura	19,782	44.63%	24,546	55.37%	-4,764	-10.75%	44,328	-23.46%
Davis	Yolo	19,121	63.58%	10,954	36.42%	8,167	27.16%	30,075	-43.75%
West Sacramento	Yolo	9,569	44.67%	11,854	55.33%	-2,285	-10.67%	21,423	-33.32%
Winters	Yolo	1,460	42.16%	2,003	57.84%	-543	-15.68%	3,463	-28.16%
Woodland	Yolo	10,774	44.14%	13,636	55.86%	-2,862	-11.72%	24,410	-29.33%
Unincorporated Area	Yolo	4,317	42.36%	5,875	57.64%	-1,558	-15.29%	10,192	-29.78%
Marysville	Yuba	1,441	37.54%	2,398	62.46%	-957	-24.93%	3,839	-0.70%
Wheatland	Yuba	466	28.33%	1,179	71.67%	-713	-43.34%	1,645	-5.62%
Unincorporated Area	Yuba	7,957	33.93%	15,492	66.07%	-7,535	-32.13%	23,449	-6.87%
Totals		7,469,803	49.29%	7,686,126	50.71%	-216,323	-1.43%	15,155,929	-21.57%

Cities & Unincorporated Areas that voted "Yes" on Proposition 32 and for Donald Trump

- Calipatria (Imperial)
- Holtville (Imperial)
- Avenal (Kings)
- Corcoran (Kings)

Cities & Unincorporated Areas that voted "No" on Proposition 32 and for Kamala Harris

- Livermore (Alameda)
- Amador (Amador)
- Chico (Butte)
- Brentwood (Contra Costa)
- Clayton (Contra Costa)
- Danville (Contra Costa)
- Placerville (El Dorado)
- Fresno (Fresno)
- Sanger (Fresno)
- Selma (Fresno)
- Ferndale (Humboldt)
- Unincorporated Area (Humboldt)
- Bishop (Inyo)
- Lakeport (Lake)
- Agoura Hills (Los Angeles)
- Arcadia (Los Angeles)
- Azusa (Los Angeles)
- Calabasas (Los Angeles)
- Cerritos (Los Angeles)
- Claremont (Los Angeles)
- Covina (Los Angeles)
- Diamond Bar (Los Angeles)
- Downey (Los Angeles)
- Duarte (Los Angeles)
- El Segundo (Los Angeles)
- Hermosa Beach (Los Angeles)
- Hidden Hills (Los Angeles)
- Irwindale (Los Angeles)
- La Canada Flintridge (Los Angeles)
- La Mirada (Los Angeles)
- Lakewood (Los Angeles)
- Lancaster (Los Angeles)
- Lomita (Los Angeles)
- Malibu (Los Angeles)
- Manhattan Beach (Los Angeles)
- Monrovia (Los Angeles)
- Monterey Park (Los Angeles)
- Palmdale (Los Angeles)
- Palos Verdes Estates (Los Angeles)
- Rancho Palos Verdes (Los Angeles)
- Redondo Beach (Los Angeles)
- Rolling Hills Estates (Los Angeles)
- Rosemead (Los Angeles)
- San Gabriel (Los Angeles)
- San Marino (Los Angeles)
- Santa Clarita (Los Angeles)
- Santa Fe Springs (Los Angeles)
- Sierra Madre (Los Angeles)
- Temple City (Los Angeles)
- Torrance (Los Angeles)
- Walnut (Los Angeles)
- West Covina (Los Angeles)
- Westlake Village (Los Angeles)
- Whittier (Los Angeles)
- Belvedere (Marin)
- Ross (Marin)
- Merced (Merced)
- Unincorporated Area (Mono)
- Unincorporated Area (Monterey)
- Unincorporated Area (Napa)
- Grass Valley (Nevada)
- Unincorporated Area (Nevada)
- Aliso Viejo (Orange)
- Anaheim (Orange)
- Buena Park (Orange)
- Costa Mesa (Orange)
- Cypress (Orange)
- Fullerton (Orange)
- Irvine (Orange)
- La Habra (Orange)
- La Palma (Orange)
- Laguna Beach (Orange)
- Laguna Hills (Orange)
- Laguna Niguel (Orange)
- Laguna Woods (Orange)
- Lake Forest (Orange)
- Los Alamitos (Orange)
- Orange (Orange)
- Placentia (Orange)
- Seal Beach (Orange)
- Tustin (Orange)
- Auburn (Placer)
- Indio (Riverside)
- La Quinta (Riverside)
- Palm Desert (Riverside)
- Riverside (Riverside)
- Elk Grove (Sacramento)
- Folsom (Sacramento)
- Isleton (Sacramento)
- Rancho Cordova (Sacramento)
- Unincorporated Area (Sacramento)
- Loma Linda (San Bernardino)
- Ontario (San Bernardino)
- Redlands (San Bernardino)
- Upland (San Bernardino)
- Carlsbad (San Diego)
- Coronado (San Diego)
- Del Mar (San Diego)
- Encinitas (San Diego)
- Escondido (San Diego)
- La Mesa (San Diego)
- Oceanside (San Diego)
- Poway (San Diego)
- San Marcos (San Diego)
- Solana Beach (San Diego)
- Vista (San Diego)
- Arroyo Grande (San Luis Obispo)
- Atascadero (San Luis Obispo)
- Grover Beach (San Luis Obispo)
- Morro Bay (San Luis Obispo)
- Pismo Beach (San Luis Obispo)
- Unincorporated Area (San Luis Obispo)
- Atherton (San Mateo)
- Hillsborough (San Mateo)
- Millbrae (San Mateo)
- Woodside (San Mateo)
- Buellton (Santa Barbara)
- Guadalupe (Santa Barbara)
- Lompoc (Santa Barbara)
- Santa Maria (Santa Barbara)
- Solvang (Santa Barbara)
- Unincorporated Area (Santa Barbara)
- Los Altos Hills (Santa Clara)
- Monte Sereno (Santa Clara)
- Saratoga (Santa Clara)
- Rio Vista (Solano)
- Vacaville (Solano)
- Windsor (Sonoma)
- Woodlake (Tulare)
- Camarillo (Ventura)
- Fillmore (Ventura)
- Moorpark (Ventura)
- Thousand Oaks (Ventura)
- Unincorporated Area (Ventura)
- West Sacramento (Yolo)
- Winters (Yolo)
- Woodland (Yolo)
- Unincorporated Area (Yolo)

== See also ==
- 2024 United States ballot measures
- List of California ballot propositions
