= Collective Action for Safe Spaces =

Anti-harassment organization

Collective Action for Safe Spaces (CASS) is an American nonprofit organization based in Washington, D.C. It says it is "a grassroots organization that works to build a community free from public sexual harassment and assault."

The group's outlook is feminist and intersectional, focusing on how street harassment and toxic masculinity affect women as well as LGBT people and people of color. It supports the decriminalization of sex work through its DecrimNow campaign. The group and its members heavily use social media in campaigns.

In May 2016, CASS launched the Safe Bars Collective, a training program to help bar staff recognize signals that someone might feel unsafe or uncomfortable. The initiative also trains transgender workers of color in Washington, D.C. alongside the Restaurant Opportunities Center.

== See also ==
- Safe space
- Nona Conner
