= Proposition 32 =

Proposition 32 may refer to:

- 2012 California Proposition 32, a ballot measure about political contributions by labor unions
- 2024 California Proposition 32, a ballot measure to raise the California minimum wage to $18
