= WGA =

WGA may refer to:

In arts and entertainment:

- Web Gallery of Art
- Writers Guild of Alberta
- Writers Guild of America, an American union
  - Writers Guild of America, East
  - Writers Guild of America West

Other uses:

- Wagga Wagga Airport (IATA code)
- RAAF Base Wagga (IATA code)
- Western Golf Association
- Western Governors Association, a group of American governors in western states and territories
- Western Growers Association, an association representing farmers in the states of California and Arizona
- Wheat Germ Agglutinin, a protein that protects wheat from insects, yeast and bacteria
- Windows Genuine Advantage
- Western Global Airlines
- Whole genome association study
- Whole of Government Accounts, accruals based accounts covering the whole of the UK public sector
- World Goldpanning Association
- Wycliffe Global Alliance
- Phoenix-Mesa Gateway Airport, formerly Williams Gateway Airport
