= Aspiration, Inc. =

American financial company, 2013–2025

Aspiration
- Logo since 2021
- Type: Private
- Industry: Finance
- Founded: 2013
- Founder: Andrei Cherny; Joe Sanberg
- Headquarters: Los Angeles, California
- Area served: United States
- Website: cdn.aspiration.com

Aspiration was a sustainability-as-a-service company with global operations based in Los Angeles, California. In March 2025, after co-founder Joe Sanberg was arrested and charged with fraud, the company went into bankruptcy, with all of its assets liquidated by July. In October 2025, Sanberg pleaded guilty to defrauding investors and banks out of US$248 million. Sanberg inflated Aspiration's revenue numbers by concealing that revenue booked to external customers was in fact from entities controlled by Sanberg, and, along with board member Ibrahim AlHusseini created false bank statements in order to fraudulently obtain $145 million in loans.

== History ==
Aspiration was founded in 2013 by Andrei Cherny and Joseph Sanberg. It opened for business in February 2015.

As of May 2020, Aspiration had raised over $250 million in funding.

In August 2021, Aspiration announced that it would go public on the New York Stock Exchange by merging with the special-purpose acquisition company (SPAC) InterPrivate III Financial Partners in a $2.3 billion merger. Ahead of the merger, Oaktree Capital Management and investment affiliates of billionaire Steve Ballmer committed $315 million in additional financing to Aspiration.

In October 2022, Olivia Albrecht succeeded Andrei Cherny as CEO of Aspiration.

In January 2024, the United States Department of Justice and the Commodity Futures Trading Commission launched an investigation into the firm's claims to have planted 35 million trees to offset carbon emissions. Cherny told ProPublica that only 12 million trees had been planted. Bloomberg reported that authorities were reviewing Cherny's and Sanberg's actions as part of the probe.

By 2025, the company was known as CTN Holdings, with affiliates including Catona Climate Solutions. On March 31, 2025, CTN filed for Chapter 11 bankruptcy protection after it was reported that its co-founder was arrested and facing felony fraud charges. The company plans to shed most of its debt and sell itself to creditors. In July 2025, the company converted its Chapter 11 case to a Chapter 7 bankruptcy liquidation after selling all of its available assets.

In October 2025, co-founder Joe Sanberg pleaded guilty to defrauding investors and banks out of $248 million. Sanberg inflated Aspiration's revenue numbers by concealing that revenue booked to external customers was in fact from entities controlled by Sanberg, and, along with board member Ibrahim AlHusseini created false bank statements in order to fraudulently obtain $145 million in loans. AlHusseini pleaded guilty in March.

In April 2026, Ballmer sent a letter to the judge sentencing Sanberg, arguing against leniency in Sanberg's potential two 17-year sentences, stating that Ballmer was defrauded out of $60 million and has suffered immense reputational harm from Sanberg's use of Ballmer's name as an investor in Aspiration to con others into investing in Aspiration. On June 1, 2026, U.S. district judge Stephen Victor Wilson sentenced Sanberg to 14 years in federal prison.

=== Los Angeles Clippers salary cap scandal ===
On September 3, 2025, Pablo Torre reported on his podcast that Los Angeles Clippers owner Steve Ballmer and the team used Aspiration as a means of paying player Kawhi Leonard an extra $28 million, circumventing the NBA salary cap, and that the company offered more than Intuit to own the naming rights to the Intuit Dome. In November 2025, Torre reported 11 Aspiration investors were suing Ballmer for allegedly using the company to funnel money to Kawhi Leonard.

== Products ==
In April 2017, the company launched a feature on its mobile app called Aspiration Impact Measurement (AIM), which examined 75,000 data points, and showed scores for companies where Aspiration customers shopped, based on how those companies treat people and the planet. Each Aspiration customer was also given a personal AIM score based on their purchasing behavior.

In November 2015, the company launched the Aspiration Redwood Fund. Aspiration said the mutual fund did not invest in companies involved in the alcohol, tobacco, arms and military, nuclear power, gambling, pornography, and oil and gas industries. However, the fund owned shares in several companies that heavily use fossil fuels. Almost 3% of the fund's holdings were in Southwest Airlines's stocks, which had emitted 12.6 million tons of greenhouse gases in 2020; in contrast, only 2.3% of the fund's holdings were in sustainable energy stocks. The fund also owned shares of MSA Safety, a company making safety products for the military and fossil fuel industry.

The company allowed its customers to name their own checking and investing fees through its "Pay What Is Fair" initiative.

Aspiration launched a feature called "Plant Your Change" in April 2020 that allowed customers to round up any transaction to the nearest dollar to plant one tree. By April of the following year, Aspiration customers collectively helped plant over 10 million trees.

Launched in March 2021, the Aspiration Zero credit card offered cash-back rewards and allowed cardholders to offset their carbon footprint by turning every purchase into a newly planted tree. But in April 2023, the company announced the cards would be discontinued and the accounts closed the following month telling customers, "We've [Aspiration] made the difficult decision to discontinue the Aspiration Zero credit card program as we evaluate the best solutions for delivering positive climate action."

== Recognition ==
- 2015: Money magazine's Best Checking Account
- 2016: Fast Company's Most Innovative Companies
- 2017: Inc magazine's Most Disruptive Companies of the Year
- 2021: Money Under 30’s Best Socially Conscious Company
