= Joe Sanberg =

American fraudster, entrepreneur and investor (born 1979)

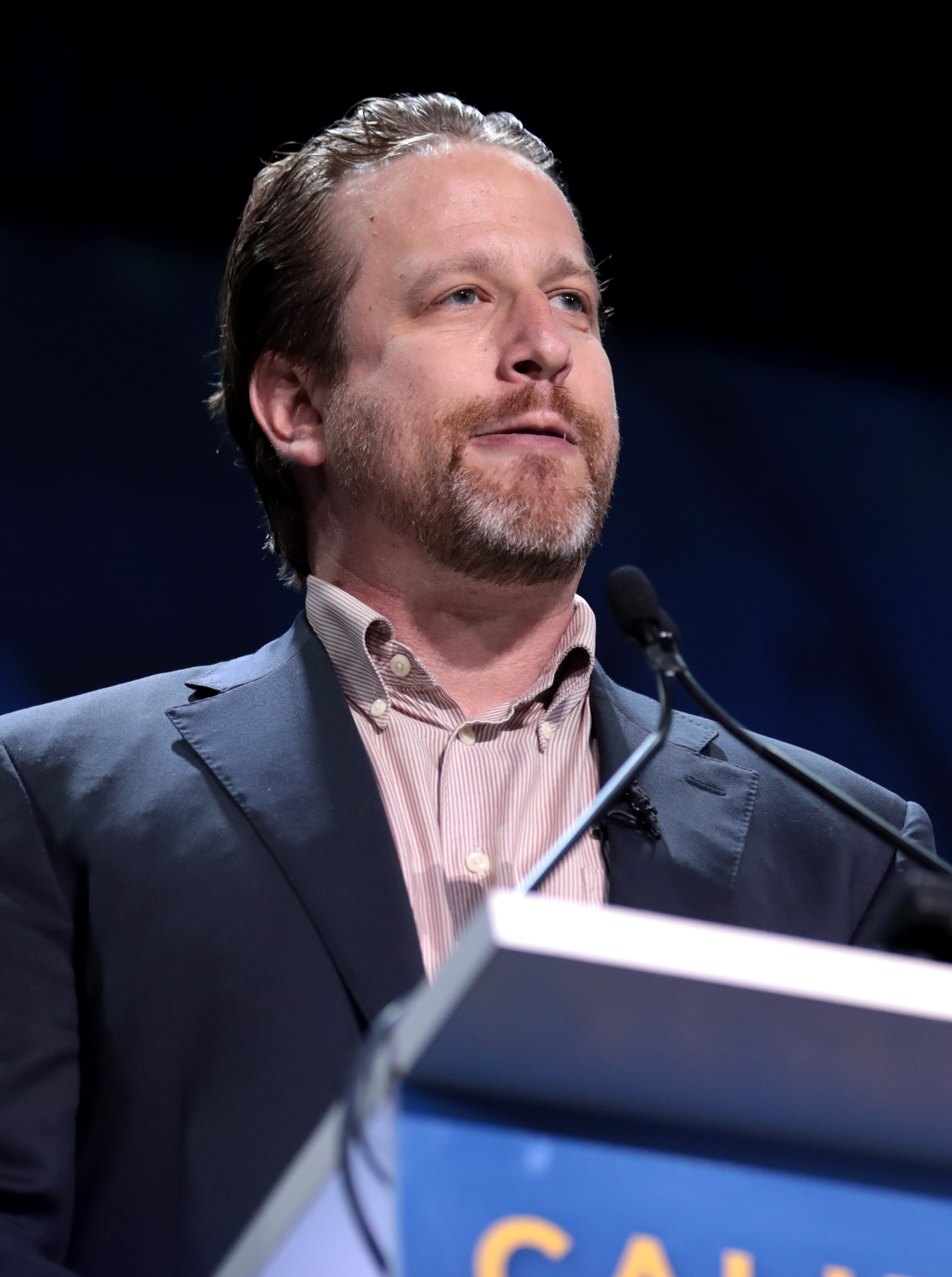
- Sanberg in 2019
- Born: July 12, 1979 (age 47); Southern California, U.S.
- Education: Harvard University (AB)
- Political party: Democratic

Joseph Neal Sanberg (born July 12, 1979) is an American entrepreneur who was convicted of defrauding investors and banks out of $248 million as co-founder of Aspiration, Inc. He was also an early investor in meal delivery service Blue Apron. On June 1, 2026, Sanberg was sentenced to 14 years in prison for the Aspiration fraud.

== Early life ==
Born and raised in Southern California, Sanberg went to Anaheim's Servite High School and studied at Harvard University. He is Jewish.

== Career ==
Joe Sanberg has described that after college he went to work on Wall Street to earn enough to feel monetarily secure. Sanberg joined Blackstone Inc as an analyst and later became a managing director at Tiger Global Management. However, finding that Wall Street "divorced service from profit" he shifted to investing in start-ups, including the meal delivery outfit Blue Apron and Aspiration.com.

Sanberg co-founded Aspiration, Inc., an online financial company, with Andrei Cherny in 2013. Sanberg is a founding investor in Blue Apron, a home meal delivery service and IVY.com, a "social university".

Sanberg serves on the Board of Governors at the Jefferson Awards Foundation, an organization that engages over a million youth in volunteer programs and public service annually.

Sanberg was called "the spark" for his leadership in 2015 toward California launching an Earned Income Tax Credit (EITC). To support the California EITC, he founded a statewide outreach program called CalEITC4Me that is administered by Golden State Opportunity Foundation, which conducts research, analysis, public information and education programs with the aim of creating economic security for Californians. CalEITC4Me helps working families claim the state and federal earned income tax credits (EITC) and helps families get free tax preparation services. Sanberg said he supported raising the minimum income for EITC eligibility to $20,000.

=== Political speculation ===
Sanberg spoke at a NewDEAL conference in 2016, where he advocated for a business-friendly approach within the Democratic Party. It was reported in 2018 that Sanberg was considering a run for president in 2020 on an anti-poverty platform. Sanberg stated that he would support whoever the Democratic nominee is if he did not run. Sanberg began traveling to Ohio in April 2019 to test the possibility of a presidential run. Ultimately, on June 1, 2019, at the California Democrats State Convention, Sanberg announced that he would not campaign for the presidency.

Sanberg attacked the 2021 recall election to remove California Governor Gavin Newsom, as "anti-democratic" though he was also speculated by the media as a potential candidate in the election.

In 2024, Sanberg led an initiative in California to raise the minimum wage to $18/hour, and organizers purportedly received more than 1 million signatures. Sanberg claimed that the idea is "wildly popular," with over 60% support. The initiative failed with 50.7% of voters voting "no" on the proposition.

== Fraud conviction and imprisonment ==
In March 2025, the U.S. Department of Justice charged Sanberg in the U.S. District Court for the Central District of California with defrauding investors out of more than $145 million. In August 2025, he agreed to plead guilty to two counts of federal wire fraud. Prosecutors cited losses to investors of more than $248 million. Investigation by additional authorities is ongoing.

In October 2025, Sanberg formally changed his plea to guilty. He admitted he inflated Aspiration's revenue numbers by concealing that revenue booked to external customers was in fact from entities he controlled and that, along with board member Ibrahim AlHusseini, he created false bank statements in order to fraudulently obtain $145 million in loans. On June 1, 2026, U.S. district judge Stephen Victor Wilson sentenced Sanberg to 14 years in federal prison.
