= Andrei Cherny =

American politician and businessman (born 1975)

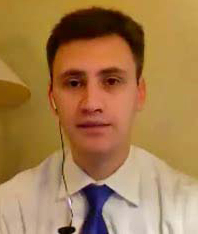
- Cherny in 2012

Chair of the Arizona Democratic Party
- In office January 22, 2011 – January 30, 2012
- Preceded by: Don Bivens
- Succeeded by: Bill Roe

Personal details
- Born: Andrei Hugo Cherny; August 4, 1975 (age 51) Los Angeles, California, U.S.
- Party: Democratic
- Spouse: Stephanie Fleischman
- Children: 2
- Education: Harvard University (BA); University of California, Berkeley (JD)

Andrei Hugo Cherny (born August 4, 1975) is an American politician and businessman. He served as the chair of the Arizona Democratic Party from 2011–2012. He co-founded Aspiration, Inc., an eco-friendly financial firm based in Marina del Rey, California, and was its chief executive officer from 2013 to October 2022.

Earlier in his career, Cherny co-founded Democracy: A Journal of Ideas. Later he was a candidate for various Arizona state offices, and in congressional district primary elections.

== Early life and education ==
Cherny was born in Los Angeles, on August 4, 1975. His parents, Helena and Pavel, were Czechoslovak Jewish immigrants who initially spoke little English.

After graduating from North Hollywood High School, Cherny graduated with honors from Harvard College. He later received his Juris Doctor from the UC Berkeley School of Law with support from The Paul & Daisy Soros Fellowships for New Americans.

Cherny was an officer in the U.S. Navy Reserve.

== Business career ==
Cherny co-founded Aspiration, Inc., an online financial company, with Joseph Sanberg in 2013. Cherny left his position as chief executive officer in 2022 after a deal to go public as a special purpose acquisition company (SPAC) at a $2.3 billion valuation fell through.

Aspiration aimed to sell carbon offsets and credits to businesses. Under Cherny's leadership, Aspiration created cash management accounts that ensured customers' deposits were with banks that did not lend to fossil fuel companies. By 2021, it was reported to have over 5 million customers. In June 2021, Cherny wrote a commentary in Fortune explaining his decision to raise his company's minimum wage to $25/hour.

=== Aspiration investigation ===
The company is being investigated for potential misconduct related to carbon credit transactions.

In January 2024, the U.S. Department of Justice and the Commodity Futures Trading Commission initiated a probe into whether Aspiration "misled customers about the quality of the carbon offsets it was selling". Bloomberg reported that authorities were reviewing Cherny's actions as part of the investigation. Cherny, who retains financial interests in the company, said in a statement that he will cooperate, saying, "The carbon removal credit industry is an emerging industry and deserves to be regulated and scrutinized to ensure it is as effective as possible".

== Political career ==
As a writer for The Harvard Crimson, Cherny wrote political pieces highlighting Bill Clinton's 1996 reelection campaign. The White House Communications Director noticed his column and circulated it until it finally reached President Clinton's desk. Clinton used several of Cherny's lines in his 1997 inaugural address and hired the twenty-one-year-old Cherny after his graduation.

He was the chief drafter of the 2000 Democratic Party platform when Al Gore was the nominee for president.

Cherny was a speechwriter for the John Kerry 2004 presidential campaign.

Cherny was a visiting fellow at the Belfer Center for Science and International Affairs in 2004.

In 2006, Cherny co-founded Democracy, a public policy journal.

In 2011, he was a Senior Fellow at the Center for American Progress.

From 2006 to 2009, Cherny served as a criminal prosecutor and Arizona Assistant Attorney General.

He is also the author of the non-fiction books The Next Deal: The Future of Public Life in the Information Age, (2001) and The Candy Bombers: The Untold Story of the Berlin Airlift and America's Finest Hour. (2008)

=== Political campaigns ===
In 2001, Cherny ran for the California State Assembly, losing to Lloyd E. Levine.

In 2010, Cherny was the Democratic nominee for state Treasurer of Arizona and lost the election to Republican Doug Ducey.

Cherny served as Chairman of the Arizona Democratic Party from January 22, 2011, through January 30, 2012.

In 2012, Cherny lost the Democratic primary for Arizona's 9th congressional district to Kyrsten Sinema.

In 2024, Cherny narrowly lost the Democratic primary for Arizona's 1st congressional district to state Representative Amish Shah.

== Publications ==
- Cherny, A. (2001). The Next Deal: The Future of Public Life in the Information Age, United States: Basic Books.
- Cherny, A. (2008). The Candy Bombers: The Untold Story of the Berlin Aircraft and America's Finest Hour. United States: Penguin Publishing Group.

Party political offices
Preceded by Don Bivens	Chair of the Arizona Democratic Party; 2011–2012	Succeeded by Bill Roe
