= Don Bivens =

American politician (born 1952)

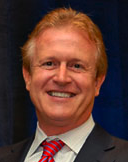

Chairman of the Arizona Democratic Party
- In office 2009 – January 22, 2011
- Preceded by: Paul Eckerstrom
- Succeeded by: Andrei Cherny

Personal details
- Born: Donald W. Bivens; February 5, 1952 (age 74) Ann Arbor, Michigan, U.S.
- Education: Yale University (BA); University of Texas School of Law (JD)
- Occupation: Attorney
- Website: bivensforsenate.com

Donald Wayne Bivens (born February 5, 1952) is an American attorney, former member of the American Bar Association's board of governors, Chair-Elect of the ABA's Section of Litigation, and former chairman of the Arizona Democratic Party.

== Personal life ==
Bivens was born in Ann Arbor, Michigan, the son of Dr. Melvin D. Bivens and Frances Bivens. In 1953, his family moved to Albuquerque, New Mexico where Bivens was raised in a middle-class family. His mother was an elementary school teacher with the Albuquerque Public School System. His father was a professor at the University of New Mexico and a board-certified obstetrician/gynecologist at Lovelace Medical Center, starting in 1953, and served as head of its OB/GYN department from 1957 until his retirement in 1983.

Beginning at an early age, Bivens held jobs as a gas station attendant, a musician, and kitchen worker. After graduating from high school, Bivens attended Yale University where he earned a B.A. degree in English in 1974, graduating magna cum laude and with departmental honors. He then earned a J.D. degree in 1977 from the University of Texas School of Law, where he served as the Note and Comment Editor on the Texas Law Review and was a member of the Order of the Barristers. In 1998, Bivens was elected as President of the Arizona State Bar. He's currently an attorney with Snell & Wilmer.

== 2012 U.S. Senate campaign ==
Bivens ran for the United States Senate seat currently held by Jon Kyl. On March 28, 2012, he withdrew from the race.
