= Nona Conner =

American activist (1983–2021)

Nona Moselle Conner
- Born: December 12, 1983; Washington, D.C., United States
- Died: May 13, 2021 (aged 37); Washington, D.C., United States

Nona Moselle Conner (December 12, 1983 – May 13, 2021) was a Washington, D.C.-based activist for the rights of sex workers, women of color and transgender women.

== Career ==
She was a member of the Collective Action for Safe Spaces (an anti-street harassment nonprofit) after being introduced to its executive director, Jessica Raven, by a friend at Whitman-Walker Health. Since 2016, she had a paid position at CASS. She was an organizer of CASS's DecrimNow campaign, which aimed to decriminalize sex work.

== Personal life ==
Conner described herself as a "triple minority": black, gay and transgender.

Conner had previously been stabbed 48 times by a man in what was a suspected anti-transgender hate crime, after she rejected his request to give him oral sex. She had previously suffered housing insecurity, financial instability, and was previously involved in sex work.

Conner died on May 13, 2021.
