= Restaurant Opportunities Center =

American nonprofit organization

Restaurant Opportunities Centers United
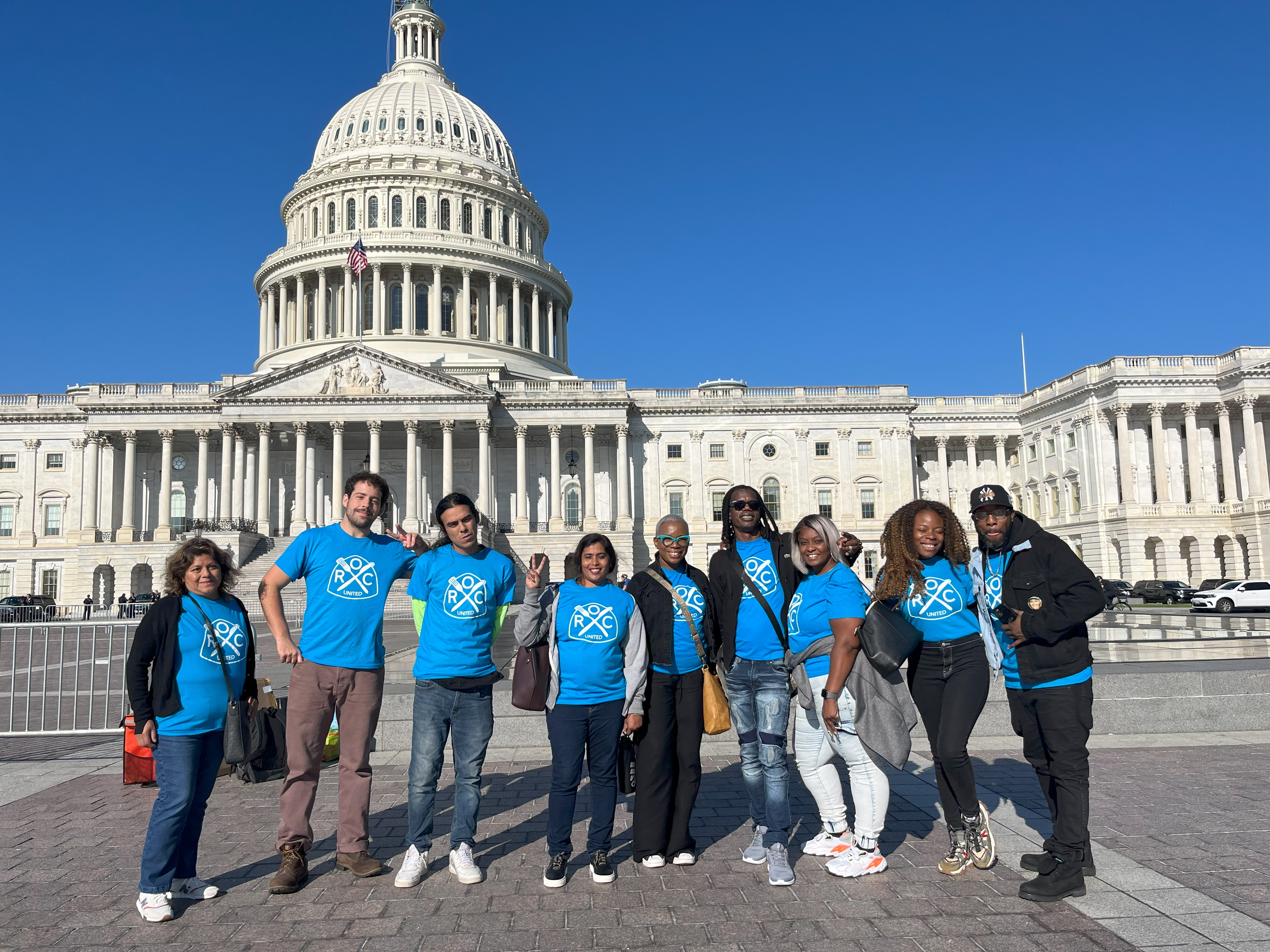
- ROC members at the launch of the Restaurant Workers Bill of Rights event in 2023
- Abbreviation: ROC United
- Formation: 2002
- Founder: Saru Jayaraman, Fekkak Mamdouh
- Type: Not-for-profit
- Purpose: To improve wages and working conditions for the nation's restaurant workforce
- Headquarters: New York, New York
- Region served: United States
- Website: rocunited.org

The Restaurant Opportunities Centers United (ROC) is a not-for-profit organization and worker center with affiliates in a number of cities across the United States. Its mission is to improve wages and working conditions for the nation's low wage restaurant workforce. Its tactics and strategy have drawn fire from business groups and restaurant industry lobbyists.

== History ==
The group was founded with funding from multiple foundations with a stated goal to “organize all unorganized restaurant workers in New York City.” ROC-NY was founded by immigration attorney Saru Jayaraman and Windows on the World waiter Fekkak Mamdouh and other restaurant workers who survived the September 11 attacks on the World Trade Center in 2001 to provide support for the displaced workers, including undocumented immigrants. These workers had worked in restaurants in the WTC, including in the Windows on the World restaurant located on its top floors.

Jayaraman is the author of Behind the Kitchen Door (2013) and Forked (2016). The first book, Behind the Kitchen Door, follows the lives of restaurant workers in eight American cities, seeking to call attention to their low wages, along with unfair labor practices, exploitation, and unsanitary kitchen practices. The second book profiles restaurants that are doing right by their employees by providing fair compensation and benefits.

Mamdouh is the co-author, with Rinku Sen, of The Accidental American: Immigration and Citizenship in the Era of Global Immigration (2008), a book that argues for a free flow of international labor to match globalization's free flow of capital.

The March 2013 announcement by Richard L. Trumka, president of the AFL-CIO, that organized labor would work more closely with groups focusing on aiding immigrant workers is one factor in the decision by business groups to target ROC.

== Activities ==
ROC conducts workplace campaigns to encourage restaurant owners to increase wages and improve working conditions for employees. ROC provides free training in many areas of restaurant work for restaurant workers and workers seeking employment in most of its chapters.

In early 2012, ROC launched its "Dignity at Darden" campaign, targeting what it alleged to be discrimination and wage theft by Darden Restaurants, which owns and operates such chains as Olive Garden, LongHorn Steakhouse and Capital Grille. ROC members and staff appeared at Darden's 2012 annual shareholder's meeting to advance their complaints. ROC dropped the lawsuit in mid-2012.

In 2013, ROC United launched its One Fair Wage campaign - a policy that would increase the tipped minimum wage to the minimum wage and allow tipping practices to remain in place. In 2019, the One Fair Wage campaign split off from ROC United and became its own non-profit with Jayaraman and Mamdouh leaving ROC United to lead the new non-profit.

Since the split in 2019, ROC has returned to its roots of workplace organizing, local policy work, and workforce development.

In 2020, ROC United raised around one million dollars to support unemployed & underemployed restaurant workers during the height of the pandemic. Some of those campaigns included the Caribou Coffee Workers United campaign, the paid sick days campaign in Pittsburgh, Pennsylvania, and the Strategic Hospitality legal settlement in Nashville, Tennessee.

In 2023, ROC United was recognized by the Occupational Safety and Health Administration for its work to address dangers and hazards of heat exposure in the restaurant industry.

Later in 2023, ROC United supported employees from the South Park-themed entertainment center in sending a petition to management, demanding more transparency and better communication on a number of issues. In 2024, employees sought union recognition with Actors’ Equity Association and IATSE Local 7.

== Research ==
The organization also undertakes research on the state of the food industry with a special focus on issues that affect food workers. ROC's more than 30 published reports have been widely cited and covered by media.

== Expansion ==
Since its founding, ROC has expanded to several cities across the country with hundreds of members. Restaurant Opportunities Centers United was founded in January 2008 following a national restaurant workers' convention that took place in Chicago in August 2007. ROC has chapter offices in Los Angeles, New Orleans, Detroit, and Chicago.

== Sources ==
- Big Labor Gambles on Restaurant Opportunity, Washington Examiner
- House Probes New York Restaurant Group, New York Post
- "Restaurant Union Serving Up Protests," Fox News
- "Tipped over the Edge," Huffington Post
- "Darden Discrimination Suit,"Huffington Post
- "Fat Salmon Workers Settle Wage Dispute,"Philly.com
- "Protesters Briefly Block Supply Entrance," Pittsburgh Post-Gazette
