= Saru Jayaraman =

American attorney/author/activist (born 1975)

Sarumathi Jayaraman
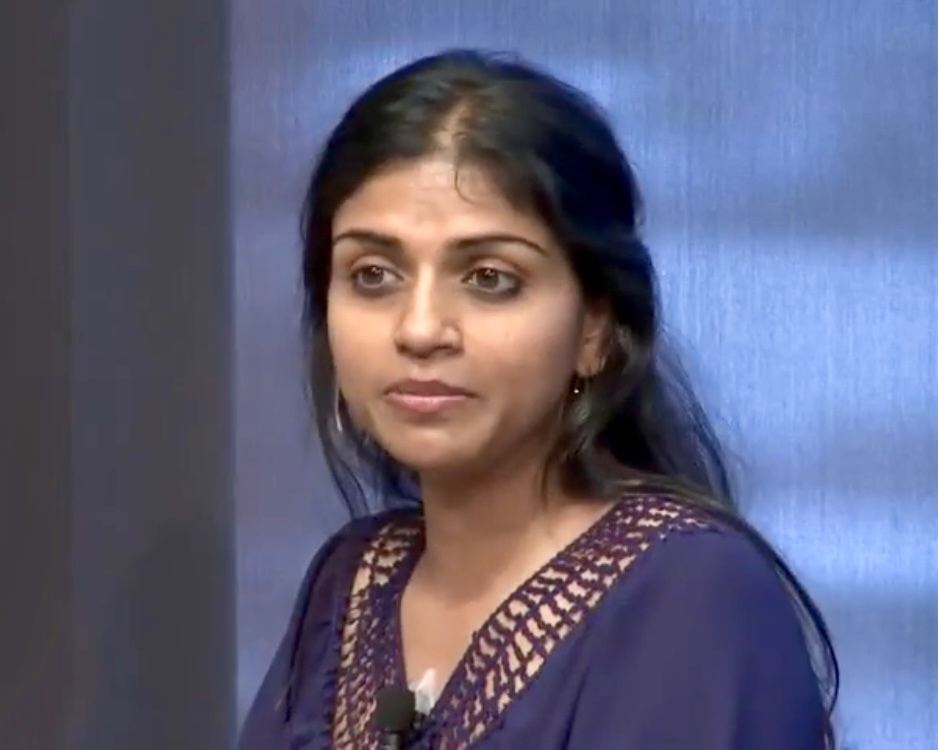
- Jayaraman in 2014
- Born: April 3, 1975 (age 51); Whittier, California, U.S.
- Education: University of California, Los Angeles (B.A.); Yale Law School (J.D.)
- Spouse: Zachary Norris
- Children: 2

Sarumathi "Saru" Jayaraman (born April 3, 1975) is an American attorney, author, and activist from Los Angeles, California. She is an advocate for fair wages for restaurant workers and other service workers in the United States. In the aftermath of September 11, she co-founded the non-profit public service organization Restaurant Opportunities Centers United. And in 2013 she founded a new organization to work on these issues, called One Fair Wage. Jayaraman is a recipient of the Ashoka fellowship in 2013 and the Soros Equality Fellowship in 2020.

== Early life ==
Born in 1975, Jayaraman was raised in a primarily hispanic neighborhood in Whittier, California. Her parents emigrated from India to the United States when her father was seeking work as a software engineer. They settled in the Los Angeles area, but Jayaraman's father lost his job when she was a teenager.

Jayaraman was made aware of her class and race at a young age. Her family and friends frequently endured racial slurs and insults, which left her "seething". One incident from her childhood occurred when many mechanics refused to service her family's car when it broke down while they were road tripping across Utah.

== Higher education ==
Jayaraman attended UCLA, where she earned her B.A. in International Development Studies and Political Science and graduated summa cum laude in 1995. She continued her education at Yale Law School and Harvard Kennedy School of Government. In 2000, Jayaraman was admitted to the State Bars in California and New York. During her time at Yale, Jayaraman studied under MacArthur Foundation Fellowship winner, Jennifer Gordon. Jayaraman was hired at Gordon's organization, the Workplace Project, where she dealt with training and organizing mistreated Latino immigrant workers to become their own advocates in instances of labor abuse.

== Restaurant Opportunities Center United ==
After September 11, 2001, Jayaraman worked in partnership with Fekkak Mamdouh, the former chief server of Windows on the World, formerly located on the top floors of the north tower, to represent the thousands of restaurant workers displaced by the attacks. That year, they founded the Restaurant Opportunities Center of New York. Although it was originally established to help those affected by 9/11, the ROC evolved and became an organizing center for all immigrant restaurant workers in New York and eventually nationwide. Jayaraman headed the expansion effort and became the co-founder and director of Restaurant Opportunities Center United in 2007. The organization deals with workplace justice campaigns, establishing living wages, and protecting workers rights. ROC United currently has over 18,000 members across 15 states and has won back more than $10 million for its members.

== One Fair Wage ==
Jayaraman and Mamdouh's newer organization One Fair Wage, founded in 2019, seeks to address inequity in U.S. wage legislation. One of the organization's key campaigns is to eliminate the "two tier" system of un-tipped and tipped minimum wage in the United States. Seven states have already ended the subminimum wage and enacted One Fair Wage legislation:California, Oregon, Washington, Nevada, Montana, Minnesota and Alaska. In early 2020, as restaurants were shuttering during the COVID-19 pandemic, Jayaraman launched the One Fair Wage Emergency Fund, raising $22 million to grant to out of work service workers. Later in 2020, the newly elected Biden-Harris presidential administration announced its support for ending the subminimum wage and increasing the federal minimum wage to $15 an hour, as reflected in the Raise the Wage Act which was introduced in house in 2021 and is pending action in Congress as of 2026. ROC United was also instrumental in the passing of Washington's Accrued Sick and Safe Leave Act, which assures that all workers can begin accumulating sick leave after one day on the job.

== Professional life and other activism ==
In 1992, Saru Jayaraman started a non-profit called Women and Youth Supporting Each Other (W.Y.S.E) which "empowers young women by providing the resources and support necessary to make positive life choices and create community change." She was recognized by President Bill Clinton during his commencement speech and was praised as "America at its best."

Jayaraman worked as a professor at various colleges in the New York area, teaching classes on a variety of topics, including political science, sociology, immigrants rights, and law. She also conducted research on food workers, sustainability, and urban poverty. Jayaraman has been serving as the leader of the Food Labor Research Center at the University of California, Berkeley since 2012. It is the first academic institution to study the relationship between food and labor.

== Personal life ==
Jayaraman is married to Zachary Norris, and has two daughters. Jayaraman and Norris met at a Rebelling Lawyers Conference. Norris was previously the executive director of the Ella Baker Center for Human Rights in San Francisco, but left after 20 years to pursue writing. The Ella Baker Center is now in the hands of Ashley Chambers.

== Works ==
Saru Jayaraman has written four books. The New Urban Immigrant Workforce, released in 2005, is about modern methods of labor organizing. It draws on first-hand accounts and ethnographies from workers in New York. Behind the Kitchen Door: The People Who Make and Serve Your Food was written in 2013. The book is about sexism, racism, and worker abuse in restaurants. Forked: A New Standard for American Dining was published in 2016. The book investigates the employment practices of a wide range of restaurants, from fine dining establishments to fast-food chains. Jayaraman's forthcoming book, One Fair Wage: Ending Subminimum Pay in America will be published by The New Press in the Fall of 2021

Jayaraman is a frequent guest on television programs including on PBS, CNN, MSNBC, and HBO's Real Time with Bill Maher. Jayaraman has also published numerous journal articles and technical reports.

== Controversy ==
In 2007, a group of former employees brought a lawsuit against Jayaraman and the Restaurant Opportunities Center. Following the attacks of September 11, 2001, Jayaraman set out to open Colors, an employee-owned restaurant for the former workers from Windows on the World that was destroyed in the attacks. However, the project faced controversy when some of the worker-owners sued to keep all the ownership of the restaurant for themselves and not other workers in the organization. In the lawsuit, Jayaraman was also accused of expelling workers for voicing their objections.

In July 2012, Darrell Issa, the GOP chairman of the House Committee on Oversight and Government Reform, announced that he had opened a probe into the Restaurant Opportunities Center, calling into question the group's federal funding. In 2019, Jayaraman left ROC to found One Fair Wage. After Jayaraman left, ROC closed Colors restaurant in New York City.

== Awards and honors ==
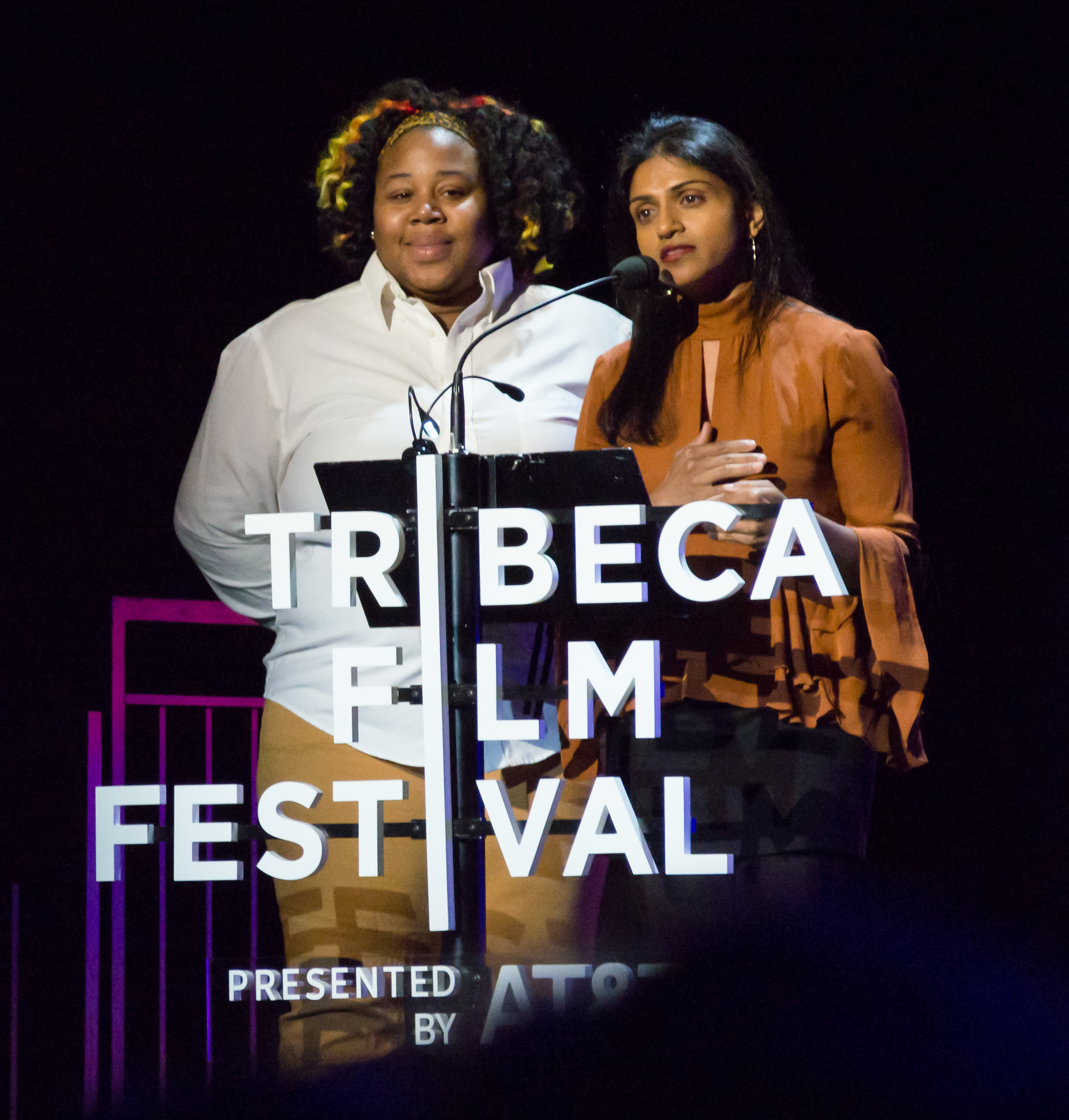
Jayaraman (right) speaks at a Time's Up event in 2018

Jayaraman was named SF Chronicle Visionary of the Year in 2019 and listed in CNN's Top10 Visionary Women. She was named a Champion of Change by the Obama administration in 2014, and was awarded a James Beard Foundation Leadership Award in 2015. She was named one of Crain's New York Business's "40 Under 40," 1010 Wins's "Newsmaker of the Year," and New York Magazine's "Influentials" of New York City." In 2018 she was chosen by the National Women's History Project as one of its honorees for Women's History Month in the United States.

Other accolades:

- Prime Movers Award. Boston, 2011-2013
- Wolfe Fellowship in the Humanities. Brooklyn College. New York, 2009-2010
- 1010 WINS "Newsmaker of the Year." New York, 2009
- Crain's New York Business "40 Under 40." New York, 2008
- Honoree, New York Committee on Occupational Safety & Health. New York, 2007
- Honoree, Workshop in Business Opportunity. New York, 2007
- Named one of the 11 Most Influential People in Food, New York Magazine's "Influentials" Issue. New York, 2007
- Immigrant Leadership Award for New York City, Mayor Bloomberg. New York, 2006
- Profiled as a New York Times "Public Life." New York, 2005
- Union Square Award winner. New York, 2003
- Harvard Foundation "Road to Success" honoree. Cambridge, 2002
- Schell Fellowship, Yale Law School. New Haven, 2000
- Dean's Award for Excellence in Student Teaching, Harvard University. Cambridge, 1998
- Annual Service Award, Harvard University John F. Kennedy School of Government. Cambridge, 1997
- Mary McCarthy Fellowship, Yale Law School. New Haven, 1996
- Outstanding Senior Award, Chancellor's Service Award, University of California at Los Angeles. Los Angeles, 1995.
- Fellow, Harry S. Truman National Fellowship. St. Louis, 1994

== Other ==
She attended the 75th Golden Globe Awards in 2018 as a guest of Amy Poehler.
