= One Fair Wage =

US nonprofit organization

- Abbreviation: OFW
- Purpose: Humanitarian
- Location: United States
- Website: onefairwage.org

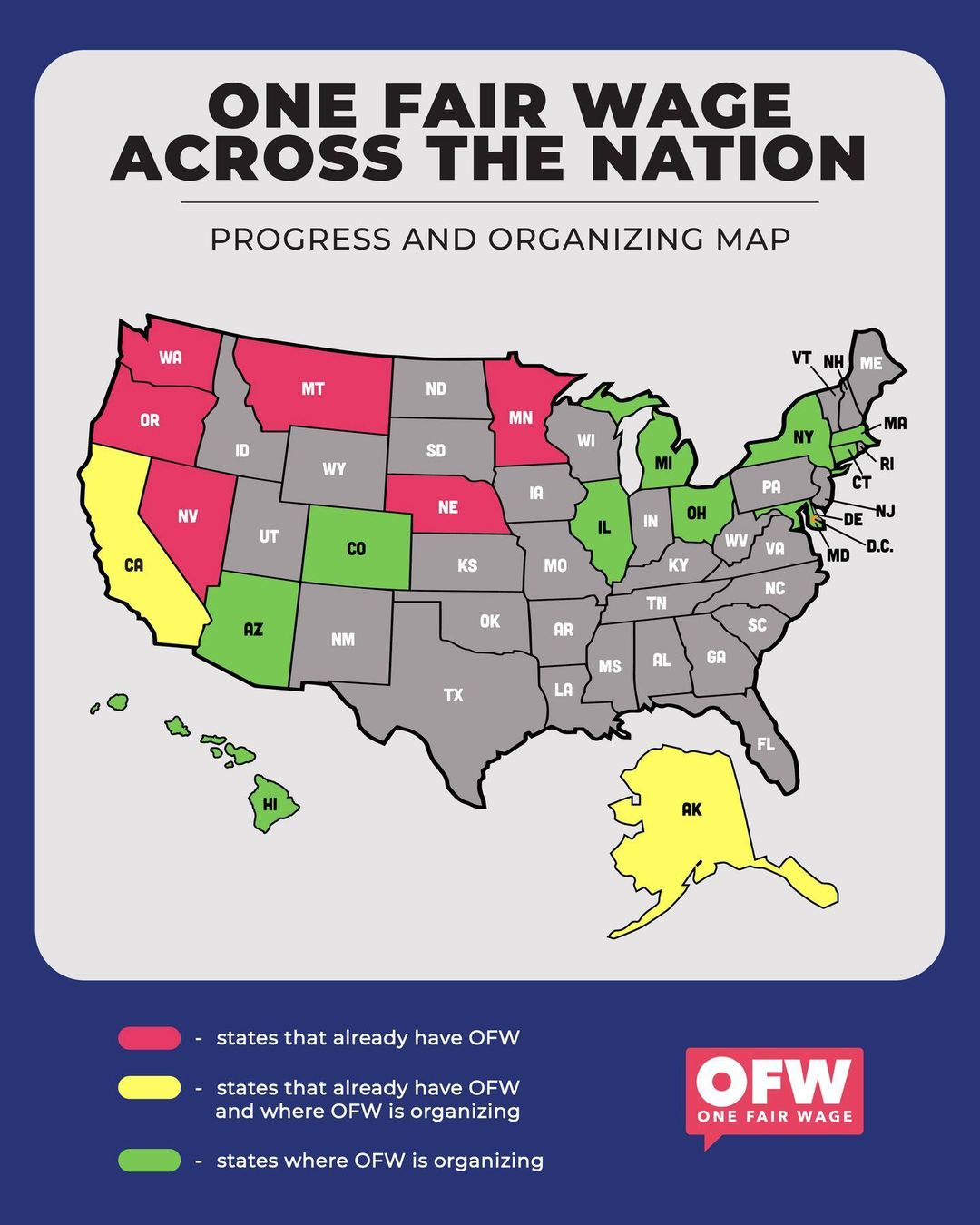
One Fair Wage progress and organizing map c. 2024

One Fair Wage is a nonprofit non-governmental organization in the United States that is led by Saru Jayaraman and Fekkak Mamdouh for restaurant workers to end the sub-minimum wage for tip workers who make less than the minimum wage before tips.

== History ==
The One Fair Wage campaigns to improve tipped wage laws by advocating for higher wages in a number of states including Washington, D.C. California and six other states already have One Fair Wage. One Fair Wage, chaired by Alicia Renee Farris, is trying to raise the minimum wage in Michigan to $12 an hour by 2022, and to $12 an hour by 2024 for tipped workers. The issue was brought to the General Election ballot on the November 2018. The Michigan Chamber of Commerce opposed the plan. In 2020, following the COVID-19 crisis, One Fair Wage began campaigning to raise money for restaurant wage workers who lost their jobs due to restaurant closures.

== Campaigns ==
In January 2023, One Fair Wage and The New York Times exposed the National Restaurant Association for using worker-funded food training program ServSafe to lobby against workers pay increases at the state and federal levels. As a result, the California State Senate has passed legislation to require employers to pay for the training, not workers, and is now headed to a vote in the Assembly.

== Median wage data ==
From the US Bureau of Labor Statistics is this wage info (includes tips):

May 2023. Percentile wage estimates for waiters and waitresses
Percentile	10%	25%	50% (Median)	75%	90%
Hourly Wage	$ 8.94	$ 11.43	$ 15.36	$ 20.00	$ 28.89
Annual Wage (Note: Annual wages have been calculated by multiplying the hourly mean wage by a "year-round, full-time" hours figure of 2,080 hours; for those occupations where there is not an hourly wage published, the annual wage has been directly calculated from the reported survey data.)	$ 18,600	$ 23,770	$ 31,940	$ 41,600	$ 60,100

== Controversy ==
The U.S. House Oversight and Accountability Committee investigated the IRS's treatment of One Fair Wage (OFW), to determine if it received undue tax benefits as a non-profit organization. The investigation, led by Rep. James Comer, centered on whether OFW’s significant lobbying activity, which is prohibited for tax-exempt charities, conflicts with its status under 501(c)(3). In a letter to IRS Commissioner Daniel Werfel, Comer cited OFW's public acknowledgment of its lobbying mission and called for a review of the IRS's handling of non-profits, requesting correspondence with OFW and related training materials by February 28, 2024.
