= Money Under 30 =

American personal finance website

- Website type: Personal finance
- Founded: 2006
- Headquarters: Yarmouth, Maine
- Area served: Worldwide
- Owner: David Weliver
- Founder: David Weliver
- Industry: Financial
- Website: moneyunder30.com
- Current status: Active

Money Under 30 is a personal finance website specializing in financial advice for young adults.

== History ==
Money Under 30 was founded in 2006 by David Weliver, the website's editor. As an intern at finance magazine SmartMoney, he observed that the financial advice was geared toward people with large portfolios, and there wasn't much available for young adults seeking basic financial advice. He initially created Money Under 30 as a way to document his efforts to recover from his own problems with debt, by working two jobs and minimizing his living expenses.

In June 2023, XLMedia completed the sale of Money Under 30 back to its original owner for $675,000.

== Recognition ==
Information and advice from the website has been cited and reprinted in media outlets including USA Today, New York Times, Washington Post, Forbes, CNBC, and Business Insider. In 2014, Kiplinger named it one of the top money and finance blogs to read. In August 2017, British marketing company XLMedia announced it had acquired Money Under 30 for $7 million.

== Services ==
The website compares financial services and offers advice on paying off debt, credit cards, student loans, mortgages, banking, and buying cars, and addresses such issues as common money mistakes and money saving strategies. It also offers a weekly newsletter and a seven-day course, MoneySchool, teaching basic finances. It caters to young adults who need help understanding the basics of personal finance.
