= Western Growers Association =

American association of farmers

The Western Growers Association (WGA) is an association representing family farmers who grow fresh produce and tree nuts in California, Arizona, Colorado and New Mexico. The issues they advocate on include farm labor regulation, immigration and guest worker programs, environment and sustainability, pest control, and water. They have offices in Sacramento (California), Phoenix (Arizona), and Washington, D.C.

== History ==
The Western Growers Association (WGA) was founded in 1926 to represent the interests of family farmers cultivating fresh produce and tree nuts. Initially focused on California, the organization expanded its advocacy efforts to include Arizona, Colorado, and New Mexico as agriculture in these regions grew.

In its early years, WGA worked to address market access issues, ensuring that farmers could sell their produce in urban centers efficiently. During the mid-20th century, the association became a prominent voice for farmers amid changing labor and regulatory landscapes. It played a significant role in advocating for farmworker programs during the establishment of the Bracero Program, which allowed Mexican laborers to work temporarily in the United States during World War II and beyond.

By the 1980s, WGA was deeply involved in immigration debates, particularly concerning the need for guest worker programs that would balance labor shortages with regulatory compliance. It supported policies aimed at stabilizing labor supply chains and reducing the impact of immigration enforcement on agricultural productivity.

Since then, WGA has broadened its focus to include sustainability initiatives, water management policies, and pest control measures. It has promoted technological innovations in agriculture, such as precision farming techniques, to enhance productivity and environmental stewardship.

== Reception ==
The WGA has been cited in articles in the New York Times on issues related to agriculture and regulation thereof, and in particular immigration and guest worker programs associated with agricultural labor. It has also been cited and quoted as an authority on produce, farm labor and immigration issues in articles in Forbes, CNN, and the Wall Street Journal.
