= List of newspapers in Oregon =

This is a list of newspapers in the U.S. state of Oregon. Oregon news historian George Stanley Turnbull discussed the growth of Oregon newspapers from the 1850s to the 1930s in his 1936 History of Oregon Newspapers. Lists of Oregon newspapers have been maintained in the Oregon Blue Book and Oregon Exchanges since at least the early 20th century; the latter noted the need for frequent updates due to changes in the news industry in 1923.

The list is divided between papers currently being produced and those produced in the past and subsequently terminated.

== Daily newspapers ==
- Albany Democrat-Herald – Albany
- The Daily Astorian – Astoria
- The Bulletin – Bend
- Corvallis Gazette-Times – Corvallis
- The Register-Guard – Eugene
- Grants Pass Daily Courier – Grants Pass
- Herald and News – Klamath Falls
- Argus Observer – Ontario
- East Oregonian – Pendleton
- The Oregonian – Portland
- Statesman Journal – Salem

== Weekly, semi-weekly and monthly newspapers ==
- Baker City Herald – Baker City
- Beaverton Valley Times – Beaverton
- Cascade Business News – Bend
- Curry Coastal Pilot – Brookings
- The Times – Brownsville
- Burns Times-Herald – Burns
- Canby Herald – Canby
- Cannon Beach Gazette – Cannon Beach
- Illinois Valley News – Cave Junction
- The Times-Journal – Condon
- The World – Coos Bay
- Coquille Valley Sentinel – Coquille
- Cottage Grove Sentinel – Cottage Grove
- Creswell Chronicle – Creswell
- Polk County Itemizer-Observer – Dallas
- Wallowa County Chieftain – Enterprise
- Estacada News – Estacada
- Siuslaw News – Florence
- News-Times – Forest Grove
- Curry County Reporter – Gold Beach
- Smoke Signals – Grand Ronde
- The Outlook – Gresham
- Hells Canyon Journal – Halfway
- Heppner Gazette-Times – Heppner
- Hillsboro Tribune – Hillsboro
- Blue Mountain Eagle – John Day
- Keizertimes – Keizer
- The Observer – La Grande
- Lake Oswego Review – Lake Oswego
- Lake County Examiner – Lakeview
- The Madras Pioneer – Madras
- North Coast Citizen – Manzanita
- McKenzie River Reflections – McKenzie Bridge
- The News-Register – McMinnville
- Rogue Valley Times – Medford
- Clackamas Review – Milwaukie
- Molalla Pioneer – Molalla
- Myrtle Point Herald – Myrtle Point
- The Newberg Graphic – Newberg
- Lincoln County Leader – Newport
- Port Orford News – Port Orford
- The Asian Reporter – Portland
- The Bee – Portland
- Daily Journal of Commerce – Portland
- Northwest Examiner – Portland
- Northwest Labor Press – Portland
- Portland Business Journal – Portland
- Portland Observer – Portland
- St. Johns Review – Portland
- Street Roots – Portland
- Central Oregonian – Prineville
- The Redmond Spokesman – Redmond
- Rogue River Press – Rogue River
- The Columbia County Chronicle & Chief – St. Helens
- Capital Press – Salem
- The South County Spotlight – Scappoose
- Seaside Signal – Seaside
- Sherwood Gazette – Sherwood
- Siletz News – Siletz
- Nugget Newspaper – Sisters
- Columbia Gorge News – The Dalles
- The New Era – Sweet Home
- Headlight-Herald – Tillamook
- Confederated Umatilla Journal – Umatilla
- Malheur Enterprise – Vale
- Spilyay Tymoo – Warm Springs
- West Linn Tidings – West Linn
- Wilsonville Spokesman – Wilsonville
- Woodburn Independent – Woodburn

== Alternative newspapers ==
- The Source Weekly – Bend
- Eugene Weekly – Eugene
- The Portland Mercury – Portland
- Willamette Week – Portland

== Digital only newspapers ==
- Ashland.news – Ashland
- Highway 58 Herald – Oakridge
- Jewish Review – Portland
- Klamath Falls News – Klamath Falls
- The News-Review – Roseburg
- Portland Alliance – Portland
- Portland Tribune – Portland
- Salem Reporter – Salem
- The Sandy Post – Sandy
- The Skanner – Portland
- Lincoln Chronicle – Yachats

== College newspapers ==
- The Clackamas Print – Clackamas Community College
- Concordia Chronicles – Concordia University
- Hilltop News – Corban University
- Eastern Voice – Eastern Oregon University
- The Crescent – George Fox University
- The Torch – Lane Community College
- The Pioneer Log – Lewis & Clark College
- The Linfield Review – Linfield University
- The Commuter – Linn-Benton Community College
- The Advocate – Mt. Hood Community College
- The Edge – Oregon Institute of Technology
- The Daily Barometer – Oregon State University
- The Pacific Index – Pacific University
- Daily Vanguard – Portland State University
- The Quest – Reed College
- The Siskiyou – Southern Oregon University
- Daily Emerald – University of Oregon
- The Beacon – University of Portland
- The Western Oregon Journal – Western Oregon University
- The Collegian – Willamette University

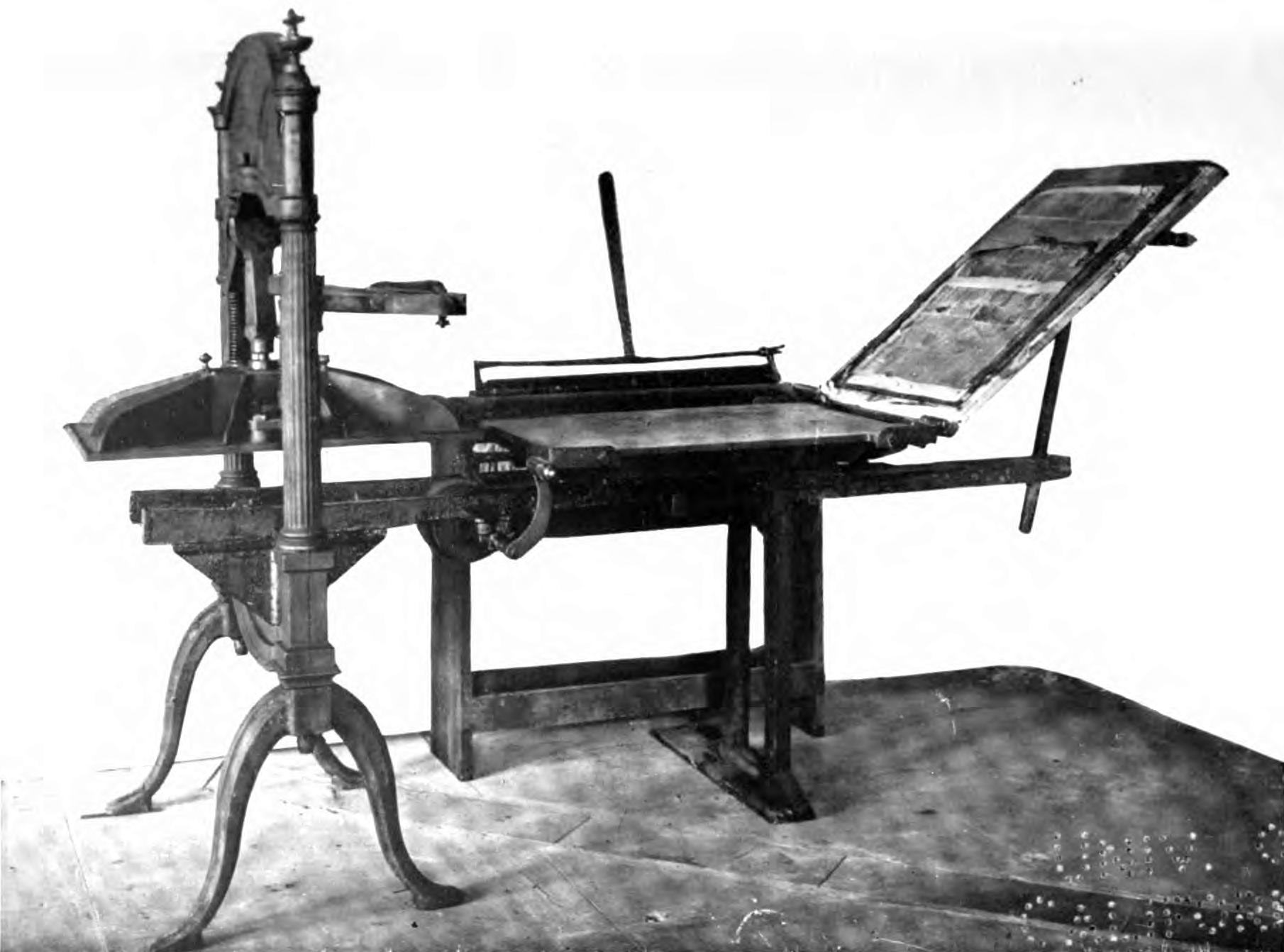
Oregon's first newspaper, the Spectator, made use of the first newspaper printing press in the western United States.

== Newspapers no longer in print ==
The earliest newspaper in Oregon was the Oregon Spectator, published in Oregon City from 1846, by a press association headed by George Abernethy. This was joined in November 1850 by the Milwaukie Western Star and two partisan papers – the Whig Oregonian, published in Portland beginning on December 4, 1850, and the Democratic Statesman, launched in Oregon City in March 1851. The latter paper would subsequently move to Salem, and it continues today as the Statesman-Journal.

Name	City	Year Est.	Defunct	Notes
Abbot Engineer	Camp Abbot	1943	1944	
The Advocate	Portland	circa 1903	1933	
Albany Inquirer	Albany	February 1861	Spring 1862	suppressed
Albany Journal	Albany	March 1863	March 1868	
Albany Register	Albany	September 1868		
Ashland Daily Tidings	Ashland	1876	August 1, 2021	
Astoria Marine Gazette	Astoria	August 1864		
Bandon Western World	Bandon	1912	August, 2020	
The Beaverton Leader	Beaverton	March 2013	2016	
Beaverton Review	Beaverton	1922	1941	
Bedrock Democrat	Baker City	1869		
Blue Mountain Times	La Grande	April 1868		
Brownsville Times	Brownsville	1889	1960	
Bulletin	Grants Pass	1949	1960	Also published 1964–1970
The Bumble Bee	Coos Bay	1869	1869	
Catholic Sentinel	Portland	1869	2022	
The Columbia Press	Warrenton	1922	2022	
Capital City Chronicle	Salem	August 1867		
Christian Messenger	Monmouth	October 1870	1887	
Commonwealth	Harrisburg	191?	1916	
Coos Bay News	Coos Bay	October 1870		Originally named Monthly Guide
Daily Grants Pass Courier aka Rogue River Daily Courier	Grants Pass	1886	1934	
The Dalles Chronicle	The Dalles	1890	2020	
Dalles Democratic State Journal	The Dalles		1863	
Dalles Journal	The Dalles	March 1859	April 1860	
Dalles Mountaineer	The Dalles	February 1860	1866	
Dalles Republican	The Dalles	1870	1901	
Dallas Times	Dallas	1869		
Damascus/Boring Observer	Boring	1970	2010	
The Drain Enterprise	Drain	1922	2015	
Dayton Tribune	Dayton	1912	2006	
Dead Mountain Echo	Oakridge	1973	2020	
Democratic Crisis	Corvallis	February 1859		
Douglas County News	Sutherlin	2002	2015	
Oregon Deutsche Zeitung	Portland	1867	1884	German newspaper
Eugene Democratic Herald	Eugene	March 1859	September 1862	suppressed
Eugene News	Eugene	March 1856	November 1856	
Eugene State Republican	Eugene	January 1862	March 1864	
Evening Telegram	Portland	1877	1939	Renamed to News-Telegram in 1931
Fern Ridge-Tribune News	Junction City	1961	2022	
Forest Grove Leader	Forest Grove	2012	2016	
Forest Grove Monthly	Forest Grove	June 1864		
Grande Ronde Sentinel	La Grande	May 1868		
Grants Pass Bulletin	Grants Pass	1927	1949	Also published 1960–1964
Greater Oregon	Halsey	1929	1978	
Halsey Enterprise	Halsey	1927	1929	
Halsey Journal	Halsey	1932	1938	
Halsey Review	Halsey	1938	1963	
Hood River News	Hood River	1905	2020	
Irrigon Irrigator	Irrigon	1904	1914	Originally named Oregon Irrigator
Jacksonville Civilian	Jacksonville	March 1862		
Jacksonville Democratic News	Jacksonville	May 1869	1872	
Jefferson Review	Jefferson	1890	2012	
The Hillsboro Argus	Hillsboro	1873	2017	
Herald of Reform	Eugene	January 1863		
Klamath Republican	Klamath Falls	1896	1914	
Klamath Reveille	Klamath Falls	July 1868		
Lafayette Courier	Lafayette	1865		
Lebanon Express	Lebanon	March 5, 1887	January 18, 2023	
Lincoln County Leader	Toledo	1893	1987	
Lincoln City News Guard	Lincoln City	1937	2024	Merged with Newport News-Times
Newport News-Times	Newport	1882	2024	Merged with Lincoln City News Guard
Mail Tribune	Medford	April 2, 1907	January 13, 2023	
McMinnville Reporter	McMinnville	1870		
Metropolis Herald	Portland	circa 1855		
Mid-county Memo	Portland	May 1985	January 2019	
Milwaukie Western Star	Milwaukie	November 1850	June 1851	
Mill City Independent Press	Mill City	1998	2014	
The Monmouth Herald	Monmouth	1908	1969	
The New Northwest	Portland	1871	1887	
North Pacific Rural Spirit	Portland	1869	1878	
Nyssa Gate City Journal	Nyssa	1937	199?	
Occidental Messenger	Corvallis	June 1857		
Oregon Agriculturalist	Salem	1865		
Oregon American and Evangelican Unionist	Tualatin Plains	June 1848	May 1849	
Oregon Arena	Salem	1862		
Oregon Churchman	Portland	1861		
Oregon City Argus	Oregon City	April 1855	May 1863	
Oregon City Courier	Oregon City	1902	1919	
Oregon City Enterprise	Oregon City	October 1866	1875	
Oregon City Free Press	Oregon City	March 1948	October 1948	
Oregon Farmer	Portland	August 1858	February 1863	
Oregon Herald	Portland	March 1866	1871	
Oregon Intelligencer	Jacksonville	November 1862	1864	
The Oregon Journal	Portland	1902	1982	
Oregon News Budget	Portland	circa 1869		
Oregon Mirror	Portland	1961		
Oregon Observer	Grants Pass	18??-	1927	
Oregon Reporter	Jacksonville	January 1865	1867	
Oregon Sentinel	Jacksonville	1855	1888	Originally named the Table Rock Sentinel until 1858
Oregon Spectator	Oregon City	1846	1855	
Oregon State Journal	Eugene	March 1864		
Oregon Unionist	Salem	1866		
Oregon Weekly Times	Portland	May 1851	1864	suppressed
Oregon Weekly Union	Corvallis		1863	
Orenco Herald	Orenco	1914	circa 1930	
Pacific Blade	McMinnville	October 1860		
Pacific Christian Advocate	Salem (1850-1859); Portland (1859-1932)	December 1850	1932	
Pacific Journal	Eugene	July 1858		
PDXS	Portland	circa 1990	circa 2000	
Pendleton Record	Pendleton	1954	2022	
People's Press	Eugene	1858		
Polk County Itemizer	Dallas	1875		
Polk County Signal	Dallas	1968	Spring 1869	
Portland Bee	Portland	1876	1882	
Portland Daily Advertiser	Portland	May 1859	1862	suppressed
Portland Daily Bulletin	Portland	1870	October 1875	
Portland Daily Evening Tribune	Portland	January 1865	February 1865	
Portland Daily News	Portland	April 1859	December 1860	
Portland Daily Plaindealer	Portland	May 1863		
Portland Daily Times	Portland	December 1860	January 1864	
Portland Daily Union	Portland	January 1864	May 1864	
Portland Democratic Standard	Portland	July 1854	1859	
Portland Evening Bulletin	Portland	January 1868		
Portland Evening Journal	Portland	1902	1902	
Portland Evening Call	Portland	circa 1870		
Portland Evening Commercial	Portland	August 1868		
Portland Letter Sheet	Portland	August 1869		
Portland News-Telegram	Portland	1906		
The Portland Reporter	Portland	February 11, 1960	October 1, 1964	
Portland Sunday Welcome	Portland	1870		
The Portland Times	Portland	between 1903 and 1919		Weekly black-owned paper edited by Advocate founder Merriman.
The Record-Courier	Baker City	1901	2016	
Religious Expositor	Eola and Corvallis	May 1856	October 1856	
Rogue Valley Messenger	Medford	2013	January 2023	
Roseburg Ensign	Roseburg	May 1867		
Roseburg Express	Roseburg	1859	1860	
Salem Daily Democratic Press	Salem	1870		
Salem Daily Democratic Tocsin	Salem	January 1868	February 1869	
Salem Daily Record	Salem	June 1867		
Salem Daily Visitor	Salem	September 1870		
Salem Democratic Review	Salem	September 1865		
Salem Mercury	Salem and Portland	1869	1893	Also known as the Sunday Mercury and Portland Mercury, not to be confused with current The Portland Mercury, in the list above
Salem Press	Salem	February 1869		
Salem Recorder	Salem	March 1861		
Salem Weekly	Salem	2005	2018	
Scio News	Scio	after 1985	2012	
Silverton Appeal Tribune	Silverton	1880	Sept. 14, 2022	
Southern Oregon Spokesman	Grants Pass	1924	1927	
Springfield News	Springfield	1903	2006	
Springfield Times	Springfield	2008	2017	
The State Rights Democrat	Albany	1865	1900	
Stayton Mail	Stayton	1894	Sept. 14, 2022	
The Sun	Sheridan	1890	2014	
Table Rock Sentinel	Jacksonville	November 1855	1878	
Torch of Reason	Silverton	November 5, 1896	December 24, 1903	
Toveritar	Astoria		1930	
Tri-County News	Junction City	1977	2009	
Umatilla Advertiser	Umatilla	1865	1869	
Umatilla Press	Umatilla	circa 1866		
Umpqua Gazette	Scottsburg	April 1854	September 1855	
The Umpqua Post	Reedsport	1996	June 2020	
Union Mountain Sentinel	Union	1868		
United Purity News		before 1928	December 15, 1932	
Vox Populi	Salem	December 1851	January 1852	
West-Lane News	Veneta	1961	2009	
Willamette Farmer	Salem	March 1869		
The Willamette News	Independence	1890s		
Willamette Valley Mercury	Corvallis	August 1868		
Yamhill Reporter	McMinnville	1883	1886	

== See also ==
- Lists of Oregon-related topics
- Oregon Newspaper Publishers Association

Comprehensive

- Lists of newspapers
- List of newspapers in the United States

Frequency

- List of free daily newspapers in the United States
- List of weekly newspapers in the United States

Circulation

- List of international newspapers originating in the United States
- List of national newspapers in the United States
- List of newspapers in the United States by circulation

Foreign language

- List of French-language newspapers published in the United States
- List of German-language newspapers published in the United States
- List of Spanish-language newspapers published in the United States

Specialty

- List of African-American newspapers in the United States
- List of alternative weekly newspapers in the United States
- List of business newspapers in the United States
- List of family-owned newspapers in the United States
- List of Jewish newspapers in the United States
- List of LGBTQ periodicals in the United States
- List of student newspapers in the United States
- List of supermarket tabloids in the United States
- List of underground press in the United States

Other

- List of defunct newspapers of the United States
