= 2010 Oregon gubernatorial election =

- November 2, 2010
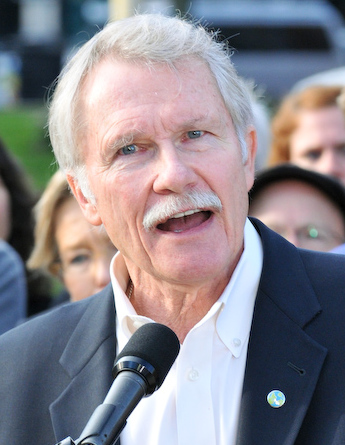

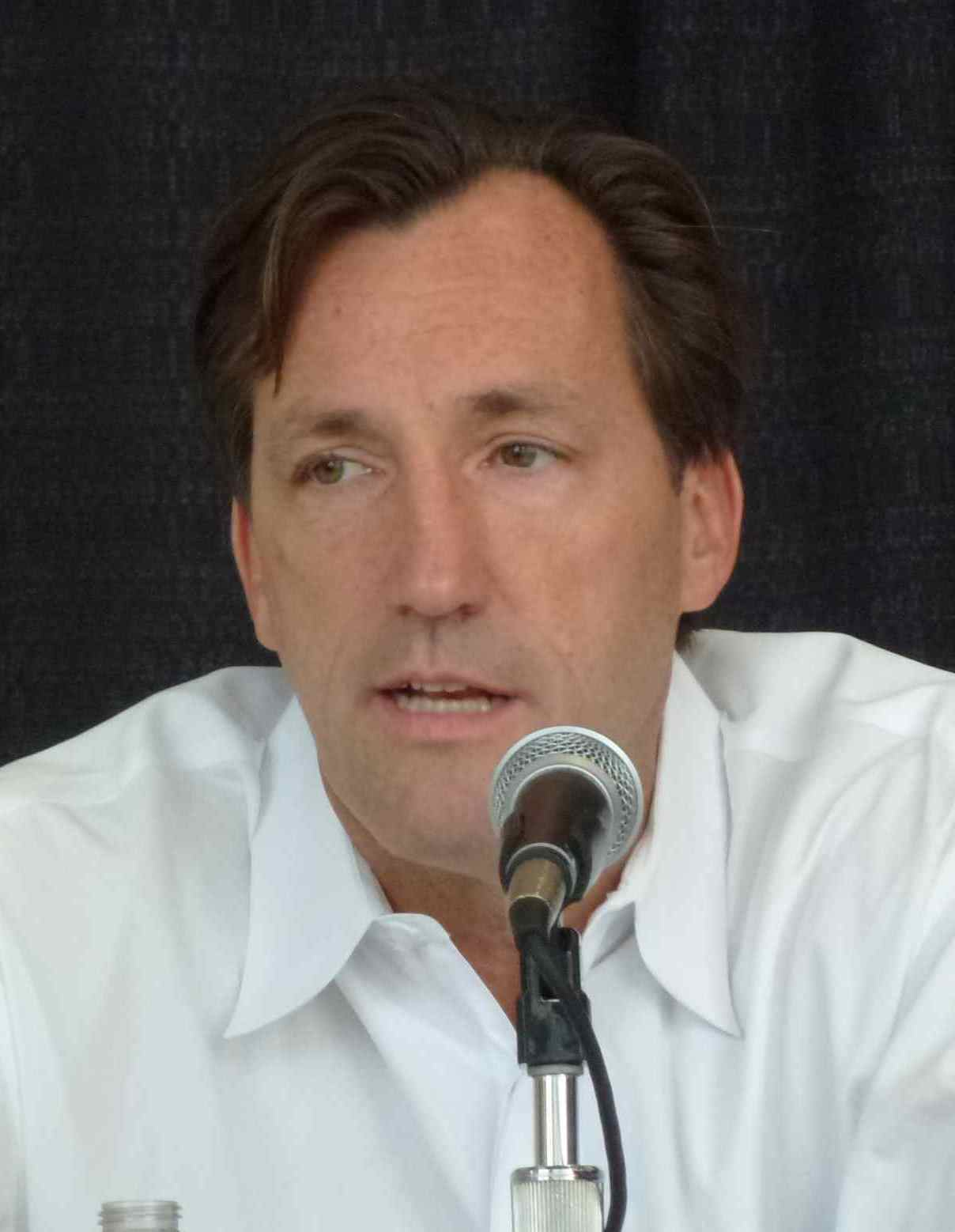
Nominee	John Kitzhaber	Chris Dudley
Party	Democratic	Republican
Alliance	Independent Party
Popular vote	716,525	694,287
Percentage	49.29%	47.76%
- County results Kitzhaber: 40–50% 50–60% 70–80% Dudley: 50–60% 60–70% 70–80%
Governor before election
Ted Kulongoski
Democratic
Elected Governor
John Kitzhaber
Democratic

The 2010 Oregon gubernatorial election was held on Tuesday, November 2, 2010, to elect the governor of Oregon to a four-year term beginning on January 10, 2011. The incumbent governor, Democrat Ted Kulongoski, was ineligible to run due to term limits barring him from being elected to more than two consecutive terms.

The Democratic candidate John Kitzhaber, who had previously served two terms as governor from 1995 to 2003, was elected to a third term, earning a narrow victory over Republican candidate Chris Dudley and two minor party candidates. Kitzhaber's election marked the first time in Oregon's history that a person has been elected to a third term as governor.

Oregon first used its new cross-nomination system, a form of fusion voting, in the 2010 general elections. In this system, a candidate for partisan public office can be nominated by up to three political parties. Kitzhaber was nominated by the Independent Party of Oregon in addition to the Democratic Party.

Almost every opinion poll throughout the election season showed a statistical tie between the two, state Republicans saw this election as the best chance to win the governorship since the last Republican governor, Victor Atiyeh, was re-elected in 1982. Once polls closed on election day, Dudley had led in early vote counts, but Kitzhaber narrowly won due to wide margins in Multnomah and Lane counties. However, this remains the closest Republicans have come to winning the governorship since that election.

== Democratic primary ==
=== Candidates ===
- John Kitzhaber, former governor of Oregon
- Bill Bradbury, former Oregon secretary of state
- Roger Obrist

=== Polling ===
Poll source	Date administered	John Kitzhaber	Bill Bradbury	Undecided
Davis, Hibbetts & Midghall	May 8–10, 2010	53%	23%	22%
Survey USA	May 7–9, 2010	59%	25%	12%

=== Debate ===
2010 Oregon gubernatorial election Democratic primary debate
No.	Date	Host	Moderator	Link	Democratic	Democratic
Key: P Participant A Absent N Not invited I Invited W Withdrawn						
Key: P Participant A Absent N Not invited I Invited W Withdrawn					John Kitzhaber	Bill Bradbury
1	Apr. 30, 2010	City Club of Portland	Ted Kaye	YouTube	P	P

=== Results ===
Results by county: Kitzhaber: 40–50%; 50–60%; 60–70%; 70–80%; 80–90%

Oregon Democratic gubernatorial primary results
Party	Candidate	Votes	%
Democratic	John Kitzhaber	242,545	64.78
Democratic	Bill Bradbury	110,298	29.46
Democratic	Roger Obrist	16,057	4.29
Democratic	Write-ins	5,504	1.47
Total votes		374,404	100.00

== Republican primary ==
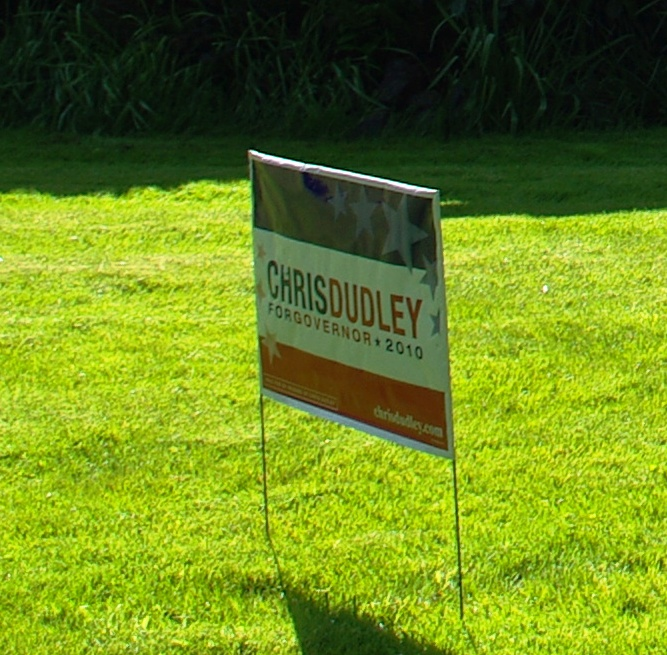
Chris Dudley sign

=== Candidates ===
- Chris Dudley, former professional basketball player
- Allen Alley, businessman and deputy chief of staff to Governor Ted Kulongoski
- Clark Colvin, business executive
- William Ames Curtright
- Bob Forthan
- Darren Karr, small business owner
- John Lim, former Oregon State Senator and unsuccessful nominee for the U.S. Senate in 1998
- Bill Sizemore, 1998 Republican nominee for Governor of Oregon
- Rex O. Watkins, real estate agent

=== Polling ===
Poll source	Date administered	Chris Dudley	Allen Alley	John Lim	Bill Sizemore	Undecided
Davis, Hibbetts & Midghall	May 8–10, 2010	33%	23%	8%	6%	24%
Survey USA	May 7–9, 2010	42%	24%	8%	8%	14%

=== Results ===
Results by county: Dudley: 30–40%; 40–50%; 50–60%; 60–70%; Alley: 20–30%; 30–40%; 40–50%

Oregon Republican gubernatorial primary results
Party	Candidate	Votes	%
Republican	Chris Dudley	122,855	39.11
Republican	Allen Alley	99,753	31.76
Republican	John Lim	47,339	15.07
Republican	Bill Sizemore	23,522	7.49
Republican	William Ames Curtright	12,497	3.98
Republican	Rex O. Watkins	3,060	0.97
Republican	Write-ins	2,001	0.64
Republican	Clark Colvin	1,206	0.38
Republican	Darren Karr	1,127	0.36
Republican	Bob Forthan	727	0.23
Total votes		314,087	100.00

== Independent Party primary ==
Oregon first used its new cross nomination system, a form of fusion voting, in the 2010 general elections. In this system, a candidate for partisan public office can be nominated by up to three political parties. As a result, the Independent Party of Oregon did not file a candidate and instead chose to hold a month-long online primary in July. In doing so, it became the first political party in the United States to conduct a binding statewide primary election entirely over the Internet, and it was the largest nominating process ever held by an Oregon minor political party. Republican Chris Dudley did not apply for the Independent Party nomination by the required date, so he was not on the ballot, but he could be written in.

=== Candidates ===
- John Kitzhaber, former Governor of Oregon
- Jerry Wilson, businessman
- Richard Esterman, photographer

=== Results ===
Independent Party of Oregon gubernatorial primary results
Party	Candidate	Votes	%
Democratic	John Kitzhaber	850	38.39
Independent Party	Richard Esterman	438	19.78
Independent Party	Write-ins	314	14.18
Independent Party	None of the above	312	14.09
Progressive	Jerry Wilson	300	13.55
Total votes		2,214	100.00

== General election ==
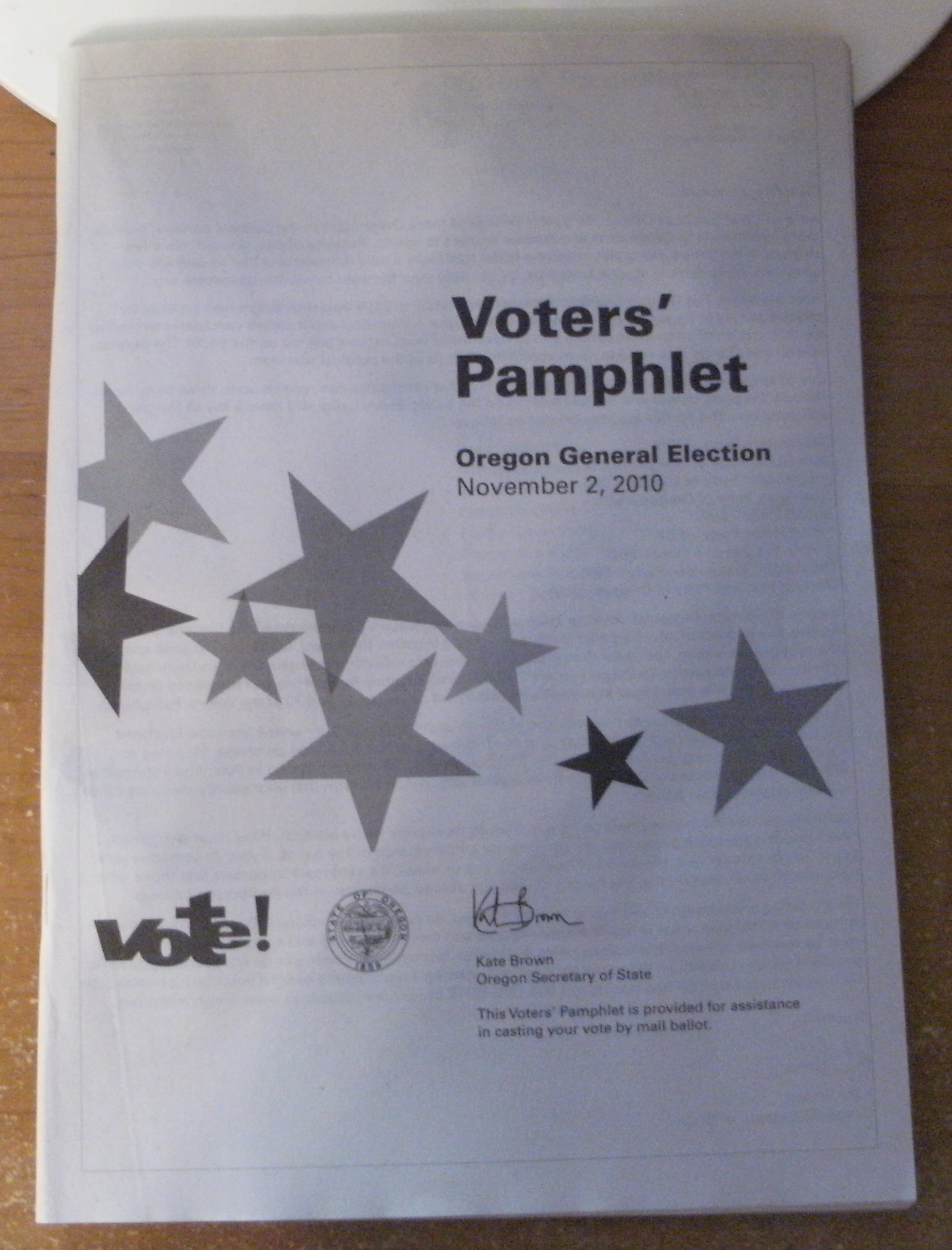
Voters' pamphlet for the 2010 general election

=== Candidates ===
- Chris Dudley (Republican), former professional basketball player
- John Kitzhaber (Democratic, Independent Party of Oregon), former Governor of Oregon
- Greg Kord (Constitution), industrial piping designer
- Wes Wagner (Libertarian), systems administrator

=== Campaign ===
Following the primaries, the two leading candidates, Dudley and Kitzhaber, campaigned separately throughout the state for the summer. Despite attempts by both campaigns to arrange a debate, the candidates could only agree on a single debate on September 30. Through the end of September, the Dudley campaign had raised $5.6 million, more than twice as much as the Kitzhaber campaign.

Throughout the last few months of the campaign, opinion polls showed a tight race with the lead apparently changing frequently. Due to the closeness of the race, President Barack Obama, for whom Oregon voted by a 16-percent margin in 2008, stumped for Kitzhaber; then headlined a rally at the Oregon Convention Center in Portland on October 20, 2010.

=== Newspaper endorsements ===
Newspaper	Endorsement
The Oregonian (Portland)	John Kitzhaber
Willamette Week (Portland)	John Kitzhaber
Portland Tribune	John Kitzhaber
The Register-Guard (Eugene)	John Kitzhaber
Statesman Journal (Salem)	Chris Dudley
Mail Tribune (Medford)	John Kitzhaber
The Bulletin (Bend)	Chris Dudley
East Oregonian (Pendleton)	John Kitzhaber
The Lake Oswego Review	John Kitzhaber
The News-Review (Roseburg)	John Kitzhaber
The Outlook (Gresham)	John Kitzhaber
The Daily Astorian	John Kitzhaber
Corvallis Gazette-Times	John Kitzhaber
News-Register (McMinnville)	Chris Dudley
The Sandy Post	John Kitzhaber
Beaverton Valley Times	John Kitzhaber
West Linn Tidings	John Kitzhaber

=== Predictions ===
Source	Ranking	As of
Cook Political Report	Tossup	October 14, 2010
Rothenberg	Tossup	October 28, 2010
RealClearPolitics	Tossup	November 1, 2010
Sabato's Crystal Ball	Lean R (flip)	October 28, 2010
CQ Politics	Lean D	October 28, 2010

=== Polling ===
Poll source	Date(s) administered	Margin of error	John Kitzhaber (D)	Chris Dudley (R)	Other candidate(s)	Undecided
Davis & Hibbitts	October 30–31, 2010	± 3.1%	46%	43%		
Survey USA	October 23–28, 2010	± 4.2%	48%	41%	2%	8%
Rasmussen Reports	October 25, 2010	± 4.0%	46%	49%	3%	3%
Hibbitts	October 24–25, 2010	± 4.4%	42%	45%	2%	12%
Elway Research	October 18–19, 2010	± 4.4%	45%	44%	3%	5%
Public Policy Polling	October 16–17, 2010	± 2.8%	48%	47%		5%
Survey USA	October 12–14, 2010	± 3.9%	46%	45%	4%	5%
Rasmussen Reports	October 10, 2010	± 4.0%	48%	46%	3%	4%
Survey USA	September 12–14, 2010	± 4.2%	43%	49%	5%	3%
Riley Research	August 31 – September 9, 2010	± 5.0%	40%	39%	5%	16%
Rasmussen Reports	September 8, 2010	± 4.0%	44%	49%	2%	5%
Rasmussen Reports	August 22, 2010	± 4.0%	44%	45%	3%	8%
Grove Insight	August 18–21, 2010	± 4.0%	44%	35%	4%	14%
Survey USA	July 25–27, 2010	± 4.2%	44%	46%	7%	4%
Rasmussen Reports	July 26, 2010	± 4.0%	44%	47%	5%	4%
Magellan Strategies	June 28, 2010	± 3.2%	40%	41%	10%	9%
Davis, Hibbits and Midghall	June 21, 2010	unk	41%	41%	6%	12%
Rasmussen Reports	June 17, 2010	± 4.5%	45%	47%	4%	4%
Survey USA	June 7–9, 2010	± 4.2%	40%	47%	6%	7%
Rasmussen Reports	May 20, 2010	± 4.5%	44%	45%	4%	6%
Rasmussen Reports	April 26, 2010	± 4.0%	41%	41%	4%	4%
Moore Insight	February 20–21, 2010	± 4.0%	45%	33%		21%
Rasmussen Reports	February 17, 2010	± 4.5%	42%	36%	7%	15%

=== Results ===
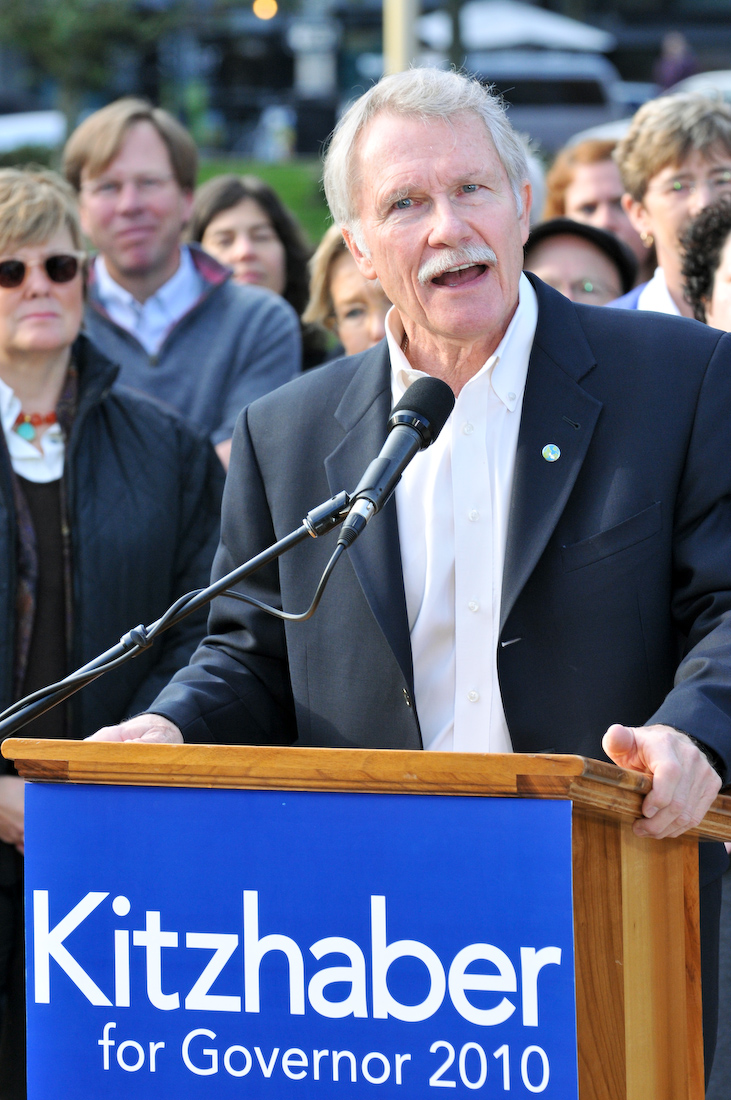
Kitzhaber gives his victory speech after winning the Oregon governorship

2010 Oregon gubernatorial election
Party	Candidate	Votes	%	±%
Democratic	John Kitzhaber	716,525	49.29%	−1.43%
Republican	Chris Dudley	694,287	47.76%	+5.01%
Constitution	Greg Kord	20,475	1.41%	−2.23%
Libertarian	Wes Wagner	19,048	1.31%	+0.09%
Write-ins		3,213	0.22%	
Majority		22,238	1.53%	−6.45%
Turnout		1,453,548		
Democratic hold		Swing		

==== By county ====
Dudley won 29 of Oregon's 36 counties. Kitzhaber won seven, including Multnomah County by a 43% margin of victory.

County	John Kitzhaber Democratic		Chris Dudley Republican		Greg Kord Constitution		Wes Wagner Libertarian		Write-in		Margin		Total
County	Votes	%	Votes	%	Votes	%	Votes	%	Votes	%	Votes	%	Total
Baker	1,949	26.8%	4,816	68.1%	187	2.6%	166	2.3%	21	0.3%	-2,867	-39.40%	7,276
Benton	21,498	59.4%	13,767	38.0%	399	1.1%	448	1.2%	77	0.2%	7,731	21.36%	36,189
Clackamas	69,250	44.3%	83,516	53.4%	1,686	1.1%	1,547	1.0%	288	0.2%	-14,266	-9.13%	156,287
Clatsop	7,654	51.3%	6,792	45.5%	196	1.3%	166	1.6%	37	0.2%	862	5.78%	14,913
Columbia	8,973	44.4%	10,302	51.0%	493	2.4%	368	1.8%	54	0.3%	-1,329	-6.58%	20,190
Coos	10,456	41.3%	13,652	53.9%	618	2.4%	583	2.3%	34	0.1%	-3,196	-12.61%	25,343
Crook	2,314	26.1%	6,231	70.3%	152	1.7%	144	1.6%	21	0.2%	-3,917	-44.20%	8,862
Curry	3,986	38.8%	5,761	56.0%	275	2.7%	245	2.4%	14	0.1%	-1,775	-17.26%	10,281
Deschutes	24,289	38.1%	37,706	59.1%	861	1.3%	815	1.3%	112	0.2%	-13,417	-21.04%	63,783
Douglas	14,072	32.5%	27,438	63.3%	952	2.2%	807	1.9%	66	0.2%	-13,366	-30.84%	43,335
Gilliam	308	32.0%	620	64.4%	25	2.6%	7	0.7%	2	0.2%	-312	-32.43%	962
Grant	749	21.6%	2,576	74.3%	86	2.5%	50	1.4%	8	0.2%	-1,827	-52.67%	3,469
Harney	800	23.8%	2,436	72.3%	76	2.3%	48	1.4%	8	0.2%	-1,636	-48.57%	3,368
Hood River	4,778	56.7%	3,434	40.7%	95	1.1%	103	1.2%	17	0.2%	1,344	15.95%	8,427
Jackson	32,360	41.7%	42,715	55.0%	1,389	1.8%	1,117	1.4%	109	0.1%	-10,355	-13.33%	77,690
Jefferson	2,132	32.3%	4,240	64.2%	110	1.7%	110	1.7%	10	0.2%	-2,108	-31.93%	6,602
Josephine	11,558	34.7%	20,025	60.2%	1,018	3.1%	646	1.9%	43	0.1%	-8,467	-25.43%	33,290
Klamath	5,820	25.1%	16,295	70.4%	560	2.4%	428	1.8%	55	0.2%	-10,475	-45.23%	23,158
Lake	658	21.0%	2,323	74.2%	80	2.6%	64	2.0%	6	0.3%	-1,665	-53.18%	3,131
Lane	81,731	57.0%	57,394	40.0%	1,855	1.3%	2,045	1.4%	488	0.3%	24,337	16.96%	143,513
Lincoln	10,484	53.0%	8,540	43.2%	347	1.8%	389	2.0%	31	0.2%	1,944	9.82%	19,791
Linn	14,466	34.8%	25,370	61.1%	898	2.2%	708	1.7%	110	0.3%	-10,904	-26.24%	41,552
Malheur	1,884	24.4%	5,440	70.4%	246	3.2%	157	2.0%	5	0.1%	-3,556	-45.99%	7,732
Marion	44,795	44.4%	53,177	52.7%	1,530	1.5%	1,192	1.2%	242	0.2%	-8,382	-8.30%	100,936
Morrow	850	26.8%	2,184	68.8%	87	2.7%	48	1.5%	6	0.2%	-1,334	-42.02%	3,175
Multnomah	198,157	70.6%	76,915	27.4%	2,149	0.8%	2,879	1.0%	750	0.3%	121,242	43.17%	280,850
Polk	12,899	43.4%	15,966	53.7%	456	1.5%	336	1.1%	67	0.2%	-3,067	-10.32%	29,724
Sherman	238	26.3%	634	70.1%	15	1.7%	17	1.9%	1	0.1%	-496	-54.81%	905
Tillamook	5,072	46.0%	5,604	50.8%	163	1.5%	173	1.6%	19	0.2%	-532	-4.82%	11,031
Umatilla	6,321	32.1%	12,574	63.8%	441	2.2%	320	1.6%	47	0.2%	-6,253	-31.74%	19,703
Union	3,366	31.6%	6,869	64.5%	221	2.1%	165	1.5%	31	0.3%	-3,503	-32.89%	10,652
Wallowa	1,088	28.6%	2,581	67.9%	79	2.1%	43	1.1%	9	0.2%	-1,493	-39.29%	3,800
Wasco	4,024	43.2%	4,938	53.1%	161	1.7%	156	1.7%	27	0.3%	-914	-9.82%	9,306
Washington	92,811	49.6%	89,926	48.1%	1,977	1.1%	1,983	1.1%	336	0.2%	2,885	1.54%	187,033
Wheeler	216	28.6%	500	66.3%	22	2.9%	15	2.0%	1	0.1%	-284	-37.67%	754
Yamhill	14,519	39.7%	20,893	57.2%	570	1.6%	492	1.3%	61	0.2%	-6,374	-17.45%	36,535

Counties that flipped from Democratic to Republican

- Clackamas (largest city: Lake Oswego)
- Columbia (largest city: St. Helens)
- Marion (largest city: Salem)
- Tillamook (largest city: Tillamook)
- Wasco (largest city: The Dalles)

== See also ==
- 2010 Oregon state elections
- 2010 United States gubernatorial elections
- Governor of Oregon
- List of governors of Oregon
