= Wilsonville Spokesman =

Weekly newspaper published in Wilsonville, Oregon

- Type: Weekly newspaper
- Format: Broadsheet
- Owner: Carpenter Media Group
- Founder: Thomas Russ Dillon
- Publisher: J. Brian Monihan
- Editor: Patrick Malee
- Founded: 1985
- Language: English
- Headquarters: Wilsonville, Oregon, USA
- Circulation: 5,254 (as of 2022)
- Website: wilsonvillespokesman.com

Newsbox with the newspaper on sale

The Wilsonville Spokesman is the local weekly newspaper in Wilsonville, Oregon, United States. Published on Wednesdays, the paper is owned by Carpenter Media Group, which owns other local newspapers in Oregon such as The Newberg Graphic and The Herald–Independent in Canby, Oregon.

== History ==
The Valley Publishing Company launched the Wilsonville Times in 1972. It was a free weekly newspaper delivered to 4,600 residents in Wilsonville, Oregon. The Times folded in 1984 due to it being an unsuccessful business venture for its entire existence. The following year Thomas Russ Dillon, who worked at Eagle Newspapers as publisher of the Canby Herald, founded a paper to replace the Times called the Wilsonville Spokesman. The paper was originally a combined edition titled the Canby Herald & Wilsonville Spokesman. The two papers were separated after a year. In January 2013, Eagle Newspapers sold the Spokesman to Pamplin Media Group. Robert B. Pamplin Jr. sold the company in June 2024 to Carpenter Media Group.

== Awards ==
In 2003, the newspaper won two awards from the Oregon Newspaper Publishers Association. That year an opinion piece printed in the paper was part of a lawsuit by a city employee against the city council relating to protected speech under the First Amendment to the United States Constitution. In 2006, the paper took two second and two third place awards for newspapers in their category from the local chapter of the Society of Professional Journalists.
