= Robert Pamplin =

Robert Pamplin may refer to:

- Robert B. Pamplin (1911–2009), American businessman and philanthropist, founder of R.B. Pamplin Corporation
- Robert B. Pamplin Jr. (born 1941), American businessman and philanthropist, current CEO of R.B. Pamplin Corporation
