= Columbia County Spotlight =

Weekly newspaper published in Scappoose, Oregon

- Type: Weekly newspaper
- Owner: Carpenter Media Group
- Publisher: Nikki DeBuse
- Editor: Mark Miller
- Founded: 1961
- Language: English
- Headquarters: 52490 SE Second St. Scappoose, Oregon 97056
- Circulation: 5,093 (as of 2022)
- Website: columbiacountyspotlight.com

The Columbia County Spotlight, previously known as the Scappoose Spotlight and the South County Spotlight, is a weekly newspaper in Columbia County, Oregon, United States, established in 1961. The paper serves Scappoose and St. Helens, and covers communities along Highway 30 from Linnton and Sauvie Island to Clatskanie. The editorial staff is based in Scappoose, while some administration and creative services are based in Milwaukie at the headquarters of Pamplin Media Group, which owns the newspaper. The Spotlight is one of a number of community newspapers in the group, including the Forest Grove News-Times and the Portland Tribune. It is a general member of the Oregon Newspaper Publishers Association and its coverage has been cited by other newspapers in the area, including The Oregonian. The paper it is part of the Northwest News Partnership, along with Daily Astorian and the EO Media Group.

== History ==
Paul Robinson established the Vernonia Eagle in August 1922. He sold it to Mark Moe in the late 1920s, and the paper was owned by Ray Fisher in the 1930s. Marvin Kamholz purchased the Eagle in 1937, and sold it to Jerry Moore in 1970 along with the Scappoose Spotlight, established in 1961. The two papers were merged in September 1974 to form the Columbia County Herald, but maintained separate front pages for the Scappoose and Vernonia editions. Moore published the paper until 1975 when he died at age 39. The paper was then acquired by Don Van Deusen, who owned the St. Johns Review. By 2012, the newspaper was called the South County Spotlight and owned by Pamplin Media Group. In 2024, Robert B. Pamplin Jr. sold his newspaper company, including the Columbia County Spotlight, to Carpenter Media Group.
