= Woodburn Independent =

Weekly newspaper published in Woodburn, Oregon

- Type: Weekly newspaper
- Format: Broadsheet
- Owner: Carpenter Media Group
- Publisher: Kim Stephens
- Editor: Justin Much
- Staff writers: 2
- Founded: 1888
- Language: English
- Headquarters: 1585 N. Pacific Hwy., Suite H Woodburn, Oregon 97071; United States
- Circulation: 5,254 (as of 2022)
- OCLC number: 11702956
- Website: woodburnindependent.com

The Woodburn Independent was a weekly paper published in Woodburn, Oregon, United States, and also covering the cities of Hubbard, Aurora, Donald, Gervais, St. Paul and Mt. Angel, and the surrounding area of Marion County. The Independent was founded in 1888. In 2026, the paper became the The Herald–Independent.

== History ==
The paper was established by Leonard H. McMahan on December 1, 1888. According to the newspaper's staff, the paper preceded the incorporation of Woodburn by about nine months and initially read more like a gossip sheet than a news source. McMahan went on to become a member of the Oregon House of Representatives during the 1923 Legislature, and a Marion County Circuit Judge from 1924 to 1943.

McMahan edited the paper until 1893. That year, the Woodburn Independent and the Woodburn World were bought by J.E. Day and A.S. Auterson, who consolidated the papers together. McMahan then started a new paper in Salem called the Evening Independent. In 1895, R.H. Miller bought Day's stake for $1,600. At that time, Auterson was the plant's foreman and Miller owned the Star job printing office in Eugene. Auterson became the paper's publisher and one time was threatened by a man demanding a retraction.

In 1898, Herbert L. Gill became a co-owner of the Independent with Auterson. In 1911, Gill sold the paper to John Ralph Bell but soon regained ownership. In 1921, Gill and his son Wayne B. Gill became co-owners of the paper. Herbert L. Gill sold his stake to Rodney W. Alden in 1930. Alden sold out to Mrs. Mabel Grass in August 1944, and who then acquired full ownership from Wayne B. Gill in October 1946.

Grass sold the paper to Edward C. Conman and Eugene F. Stoller in August 1947. Eagle Newspapers acquired the paper from Stoller in 1971. About forty years later the company sold the paper along with five others in January 2013 to Pamplin Media Group. Robert B. Pamplin Jr. sold the company in June 2024 to the Carpenter Media Group. In March 2026, the Independent merged with The Herald-Pioneer to form The Herald-Independent.

=== Lawsuit ===
The Independent sued the city of Salem when the city denied access to records of a 2017 arrest for child abuse. The newspaper lost the initial case, but won on appeal in September 2018.
