= The Herald-Independent =

Weekly newspaper published in Canby, Oregon

- Type: Weekly newspaper
- Owner: Carpenter Media Group
- Publisher: Kim Stephens
- Editor: John Baker
- General manager: Sandy Storey
- Founded: 1906 (as Canby Herald)
- City: Canby, Oregon
- Country: United States
- Circulation: 5,254 (as of 2022)
- Sister newspapers: Oregon City News, West Linn Tidings, Woodburn Independent
- OCLC number: 30710695
- Website: heraldpioneer.com

The Herald-Independent is a weekly newspaper published in Canby, Oregon, United States. It dates back to 1906. The paper also serves the cities of Aurora, Woodburn and Molalla. The Herald-Independent was formed in 2020 through the merger of the Canby Herald and Molalla Pioneer as The Herald-Pioneer and in 2026 merged with the Woodburn Independent.

== History ==
The Canby Herald dates back to 1906. In 1915, G.E. Brookins sold the Hubbard Enterprise to then purchase the Canby Herald. A year later Brookins leased his Canby printing plant and moved to Eugene to study journalism at the University of Oregon. The Clackamas County News was then started in Canby with B. E. Lee as publisher and M. J. Lee as editor. W. E. Hassler was publisher of the News for about two years until severing his ties in January 1922. He sold the News to M.J. Lee, now editor and publisher, who renamed it to the Canby Herald. A month later Lee sold the paper to A.W. Bond. In June 1923, the Herald was acquired by W.C. Culbertson. Henry E. Browne worked as the Canby Herald's publisher for 15 years and became its owner at some point. He sold it to Elbert Floyd Hall and Esther May Hall in 1937. A decade later the couple sold the paper to William Weston. In 1972, Weston and his wife merged their company with Eagle Newspapers.

A 2014 front page from the Canby Herald

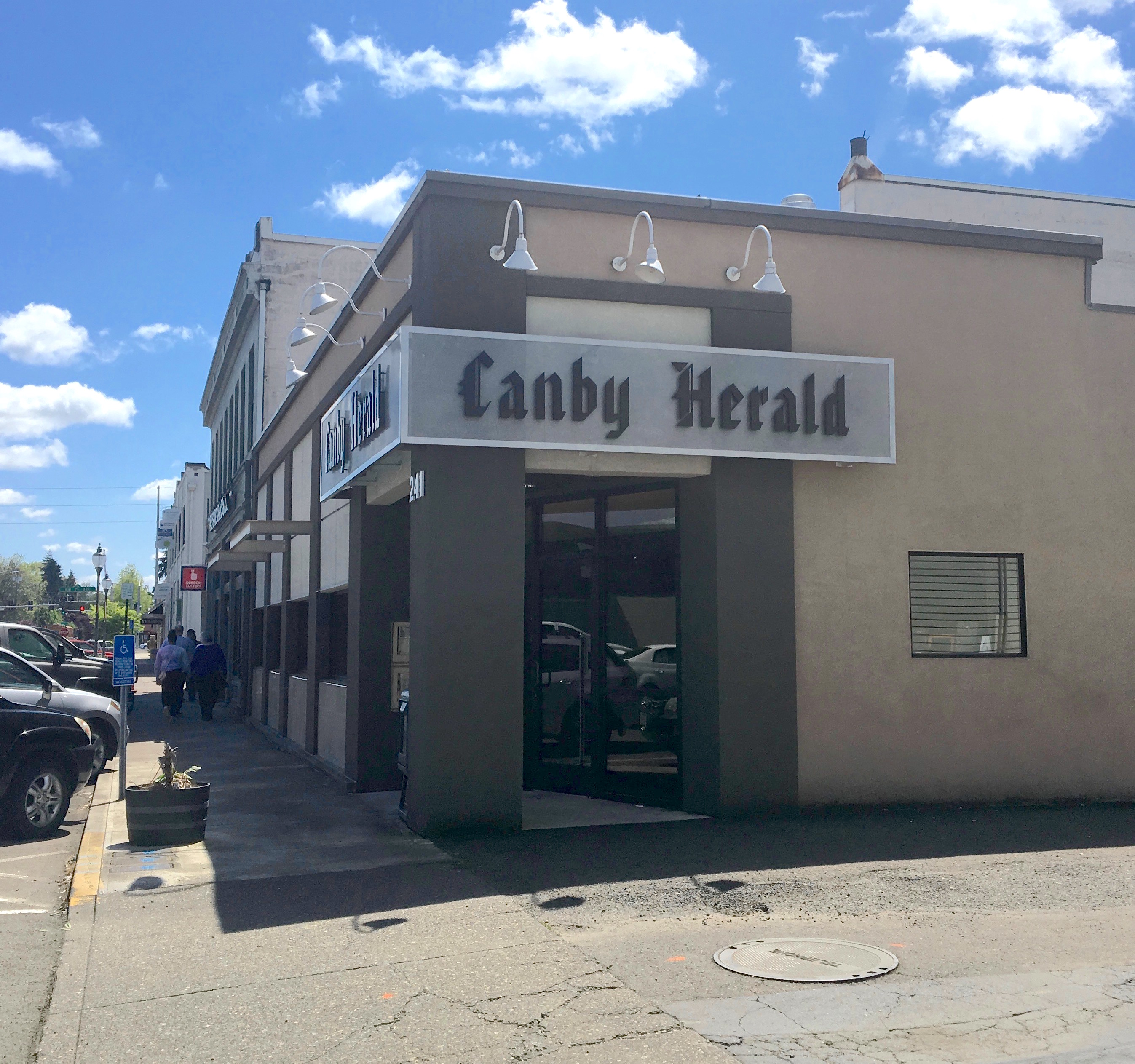
Canby Herald office in 2017

The Molalla Pioneer was first published on March 28, 1913, and was founded by Gordon J. Taylor. In 1930, he and his son Walter R. Taylor sold the paper to J. Vila Blake. A year later Blake sold the Molalla Pioneer to C. L. Ireland, who owned the paper for 15 years until selling it in January 1946 to Monroe Sweetland. In 1948, Sweetland sold the paper to Charles N. Burger, who then sold it again two years later to Howard Durfee and Earl C. Brannan. In 1952, Durfee sold the paper to Paul F. Ruud. Ruud ran the Molalla Pioneer for close to two decades until Pioneer Publishing, Inc. acquired the paper from him in 1971. Three years later the company sold it to Rodger Eddy, owner of North Willamette News. Two years later Eddy merged his company with Eagle Newspapers in 1976.

Eagle owned the Canby Herald and Molalla Pioneer for nearly four decades until selling them along with three other newspapers in January 2013 to Pamplin Media Group. Pamplin sold the two paper's shared office in August 2019 and moved them to a smaller space. In January 2020, the company announced both paper's print editions were to be merged under the title The Herald-Pioneer while continuing to maintain separate websites and social media accounts. In June 2024, Robert B. Pamplin Jr. sold his newspaper company to Carpenter Media Group. In March 2026, the Herald-Pioneer merged with the Woodburn Independent to form The Herald-Independent.
