= Lake Oswego Review =

Weekly newspaper published in Lake Oswego, Oregon

- Type: Weekly newspaper
- Owner: Carpenter Media Group
- Publisher: J. Brian Monihan
- Editor: Patrick Malee
- Founded: 1920
- City: Lake Oswego, Oregon
- Country: United States
- Circulation: 8,298 (as of 2022)
- Sister newspapers: Portland Tribune, West Linn Tidings, et al.
- ISSN: 0889-2369
- OCLC number: 13819679
- Website: lakeoswegoreview.com

The Lake Oswego Review is an American newspaper published in Lake Oswego, Oregon, within the Portland metropolitan area. The paper began as the Western Clackamas Review, was later known as the Oswego Review from 1929 through 1961, and then adopted its present name when the city of Oswego annexed Lake Grove and the lake. It was owned by the Pamplin Media Group from 2000 to 2024, and since 2024 has been owned by the Carpenter Media Group.

== History ==
The Western Clackamas Review was established in 1920. In 1927, R. C. Cooke sold the paper to Rhoads & Richards, who a few months later sold it to Paul Robinson and George Baxter. In 1941, Edward A. Donnelly purchased the Oswego Review from Harmon Marshall and Claude A. Smith. In 1946, Donnelly sold the paper to William L. Blizzard. In 1978, Blizzard sold the Lake Oswego Review to Eagle Newspapers. In 1987, Eagle merged the newspaper into a new business venture called Community Newspapers, Inc. The business was sold to Steve Clark in 1996 and later acquired by Pamplin Media Group in August 2000. Robert B. Pamplin Jr. sold his newspaper company in June 2024 to Carpenter Media Group.
