= The Hermiston Herald =

Newspaper in Hermiston, Oregon

- Type: Weekly newspaper
- Format: Broadsheet
- Owner: Carpenter Media Group
- Founder(s): Horace Greeley Newport; William Skinner
- Founded: 1906
- Language: English
- Headquarters: 333 E. Main St, Hermiston, OR 97838
- Circulation: 8,900 Print; 173 Digital (as of 2023)
- ISSN: 2995-7893
- OCLC number: 38509173
- Website: hermistonherald.com

The Hermiston Herald is a weekly newspaper published on Wednesdays in Hermiston, Oregon, United States, since 1906.

== History ==
The Herald was founded by Horace Greeley Newport and William Skinner in 1906. One newspaper wrote of the launch as so, "The Hermiston Herald is the youngest and latest newspaper swaddling to make its appearance on the Press exchange table. It is a healthy infant, comes to us in a handsome dress and apparently nursed by some one who is well up in the ways and manners of newspaper work." C. E. Baker, of Pendleton, moved to Hermiston to acquire the paper in April 1907. A few days later The Hermiston Publishing Company was incorporated by Baker and two others.

Baker, as the paper's editor/owner, in 1909 purchased a small cylinder press previously used by a Pendleton printery, allowing him to publish his paper without patent pages. Later that year he sold the paper to F. R. Reeves. Reeves operated the Herald for close to eight years until selling it to M. D. O'Connell, who a year later purchased a linotype machine. The year after that O'Connell's wife filed for divorce.

In 1920, Herald Publishing Company was incorporated again, this time owned by E. K. Kingsley and M. C. Athey. A year later Athey, who was the paper's editor, sold his interests to Bernard Mainwaring. Mainwaring went on to buy the Milton Eagle. Raymond Crowder became owner around this time and operated the Herald for four years. He sold it in 1926 to Joseph S. Harvey. Harvey left the paper after two years to work as editor of the Times in Twin Falls, Idaho. Jack M. Biggs then ran the Herald as editor and publisher for two years, and sold it in 1930 to a group of three including Alfred Quiring.

Leander Quiring joined his brother as the paper's co-owner in 1939, and went on to serve as Hermiston mayor for four years and then in the Oregon state senate. The Quirings sold The Hermiston Weekly Herald in 1945 to Dan C. Bartlett and his wife. Years later Bartlett purchased the Umatilla County Sun in 1955 and then ran for the Democratic nomination for state senator in 1958 while continuing to work as the Herald's publisher.

G. M. "Jerry" Reed bought a minority ownership stake in the paper in 1969 and became the sole owner in 1974. He bought the Heppner Gazette-Times two years later and merged his company with Eagle Newspapers in a stock-for-stock exchange in March 1979. Reed sold the Gazette-Times in August 1979 and his interests in Eagle Newspapers in 1984. He would to run the Herald until selling it to Western Communications in 1992. Reed was posthumously inducted into the Oregon Newspaper Publishers Association's hall of fame in 2017.

In 2008, the newspaper was purchased by EO Media Group (formerly known as the East Oregonian Publishing Company). In June 2024, EO Media Group announced The Hermiston Herald will cease print publication and go online-only. All print subscribers will instead receive the East Oregonian, published weekly and including news from The Hermiston Herald's website. The company was purchased by Carpenter Media Group in October 2024.
