= The Newberg Graphic =

Weekly newspaper published in Newberg, Oregon

- Type: Weekly newspaper
- Format: Broadsheet
- Owner: Carpenter Media Group
- Publisher: Al Herriges
- Editor: Gary Allen
- Founded: 1888
- Language: English
- Headquarters: 500 E. Hancock St. Newberg, Oregon 97132; United States
- Circulation: 2,500 (as of 2022)
- Website: newberggraphic.com

The Newberg Graphic is the weekly newspaper of Newberg, Oregon, United States.

== History ==
The Newberg Graphic was founded in 1888 by Hiatt & Hobson as an independent four-page weekly newspaper published on Saturdays, and sold at $2. Frank P. Baum became the paper's publisher in 1890. E. H. Woodward acquired the Graphic on Jan. 1, 1900. Woodward made the paper Republican and cut the price to $1.50. The paper reported 450 subscribers in 1903, which Woodward grew to 950.

Woodward owned the Graphic for about 21 years until he sold it to W. J. Nottage and Chester A. Dimond in 1921. Fifteen years later Nottage sold his interests in the business to James A. Dement in 1936. The paper was sold to King Cady later that year.

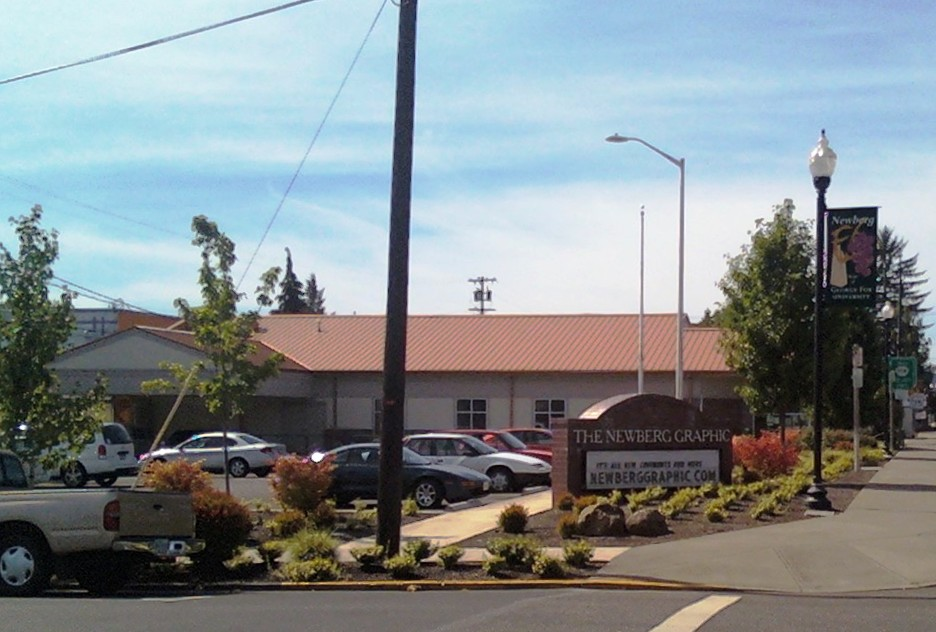
Sign for the paper along Highway 99W

In 1959, Rob McCain joined Paul Dent as a business partner in the Graphic. In 1966, a thief pried off the rear window of the Graphic's office and stole 300 blank checks.

Rob and Donna McCain owned the newspaper for 25 years until selling it to Eagle Newspapers in January 1985. The company sold the paper to Pamplin Media Group in January 2013. Robert B. Pamplin Jr. sold his newspaper company in June 2024 to the Carpenter Media Group.

== See also ==
- List of newspapers in Oregon
