= Central Oregonian =

Weekly newspaper published in Prineville, Oregon

- Type: Twice-weekly newspaper
- Owner: Carpenter Media Group
- Founder: Horace Dillard
- Founded: 1881 (as Prineville News)
- Language: English
- Headquarters: Prineville, Oregon
- Circulation: 5,253 (as of 2022)
- Website: centraloregonian.com

The Central Oregonian is a twice-weekly newspaper published in Prineville in the U.S. state of Oregon. Tracing its roots to 1881, the paper covers Central Oregon where it is the newspaper of record for Crook County.

== History ==
The first newspaper published in Prineville was the Ochoco Pioneer, founded by John E. Jeffrey in 1880. The paper ceased after a few months. In 1881, Horace Dillard founded the Prineville News. He took in D. W. Aldridge as a business partner, who later became the editor and publisher. On Nov. 11, 1883, a fire destroyed the newspaper's office, causing $1,500 worth of damage to the News. Aldridge was editor and publisher until the role was given to Fred E. Wilmarth in 1893. Aldridge sold the paper in April 1894. It was later absorbed by the Ochoco Review, started in Prineville by Douthit & Barnes in June 1885. The paper from then on was known as the Prineville Review.

In November 1894, traveling printer-editor Bruce "Rocky Mountain" Smith, a notorious heavy-drinker, recruited school-teacher W. F. Magee to publish the Mitchell Monitor in Mitchell, Oregon. A. C. Palmer purchased the paper and printing plant around 1898 and moved it to Prineville, where he renamed the Monitor to the Crook County Journal. In 1901, Palmer sold the paper to W. T. Fogle, who sold a half interest to W. H. Parker. In 1903, the paper was owned by W. C. Black and S. M. Bailey.

J. N. Williamson was made manager of the combined Prineville Review paper that formed in 1894 and was succeeded by L. N. Liggett, who bought the publication. He sold it in July 1902 to William Holder, who in turn sold it to A. H. Kennedy in April 1904. Charles O. Pollard was editor and publisher of the Review in 1915, by then renamed back to the Prineville News. A. M. Byrd purchased the News in March 1917. He renamed it the following month to the Central Oregon Enterprise. Byrd sold the paper in 1920 to Floyd A. Fessler, who renamed it to the Prineville Call.

In 1915, Guy La Follette purchased the Crook County Journal from J. H. Gray. Six years later he merged the paper with Fessler's Prineville Call on July 14, 1921 to form the Central Oregonian. Fessler sold his stake the following month to George H. Flagg, who in turn sold his share to La Follette in January 1922. La Follette, with full ownership, sold the paper for the third time in eight months to Robert H. Jonas in April 1922. Jonas and his sons sold the Central Oregonian in 1939 to Remey M. Cox, who simultaneously purchased Crook County News from Steve Bailey and merged it into the paper.

Cox's widow sold the paper to L. R. Batman in 1952. Two years Batman sold the Central Oregonian to Monroe Sweetland, who then traded it to Edward A. Donnelly for his Milwaukie Review. Donnelly purchased the Tribune Publishing Company, a newspaper printing plant in Prineville, from Steve Bailey in 1959. After Donnelly's death in 1962, his family owned the Central Oregonian until selling it in September 1969 to Eagle Newspapers. Eagle owned the paper for 44 years until selling it to Pamplin Media Group in June 2013. In October 2018, the newspaper implemented a paywall on its website, under which users are permitted free access to three stories per calendar month, after which payment of per-story fee is required for non-subscribers. In 2024, Robert B. Pamplin Jr. sold his newspaper company to Carpenter Media Group.
