= The Madras Pioneer =

Weekly newspaper published in Madras, Oregon

- Type: Weekly newspaper
- Owner: Carpenter Media Group
- Publisher: Tony Ahern
- Editor: Teresa Jackson
- Founded: 1904
- City: Madras, Oregon
- Country: United States
- Circulation: 5,300 (as of 2022)
- ISSN: 2835-6160
- OCLC number: 982172866
- Website: madraspioneer.com

The Madras Pioneer is a weekly paper published on Wednesdays in Madras, Oregon, United States. It is published on Wednesdays. It is the newspaper of record for Jefferson County.

== History ==
The Madras Pioneer was first published on August 25, 1904. A year later Max Lueddemann purchased the paper, and he sold it to Howard W. Turner in 1909. William E. Johnson became the owner in 1924, but died a year later of pneumonia. May B. Johnson owned the paper from 1925 until 1946 when she sold it to W. H. Hall.

Hall briefly operated the paper for about two years until selling out in 1948 to Bill Robinson and Elmo Smith, who went on to found Eagle Newspapers. A few months later Oscar W. Lange Jr. bought in as a third owner.

In January 2013, the paper was sold to the Pamplin Media Group along with five other papers owned by Eagle Newspapers. Robert B. Pamplin Jr. sold his newspaper company in June 2024 to the Carpenter Media Group.
