= Sandy Post =

Weekly newspaper published in Sandy, Oregon

- Type: Weekly Newspaper
- Format: Tabloid
- Owner: Carpenter Media Group
- Publisher: Steve Brown
- Editor: Steve Brown
- Founded: 1937
- Headquarters: 1584 NE Eighth Street; Gresham, OR 97030
- City: Sandy, Oregon
- Circulation: 4,209 (as of 2022)
- Sister newspapers: Estacada News; Gresham Outlook
- Website: sandypost.com

The Sandy Post is an online newspaper and former printed newspaper in Oregon serving Sandy, the Villages at Mount Hood and the surrounding areas. It is owned by the Carpenter Media Group.

== History ==
The paper was founded in 1937. It was first published by Mrs. Fern G. Lambert on January 6, 1938. Orval G. Butler purchased the Post in 1940. Butler sold it in 1947 to Tom B. Purcell, publisher of the nearby Gresham Outlook.

Walter C. Taylor Jr. bought the two papers, along with several others Oregon, in the early 1960s. Taylor and Lee Irwin sold the newspaper in 1977 to the Democrat-Herald Publishing Co., which published the Albany Democrat-Herald.

Capital Cities purchased the company in 1980, which itself was acquired by The Walt Disney Company in 1995. Disney sold its Oregon newspapers to Lee Enterprises in 1997. Three years later Robert B. Pamplin, Jr. acquired the Post from Lee Enterprises in 2000. In February 2004, The Sandy Profile, a rival newspaper, was merged into the Post.

In June 2024, Pamplin Media Group was sold to Carpenter Media Group. Later that year the Estacada News was absorbed into the Post. In July 2025, the paper's only reporter was laid off. At that time the Post ceased and subscribers from now on will receive The Gresham Outlook instead. The websites for the Post and Estacada News will remain online.

== Awards ==
In 2019, the Post won the General Excellence award for weekly newspapers from the Oregon Newspaper Publishers Association.
