= Sunnyside Sun =

Newspaper

- Type: Weekly newspaper
- Owner: Sun Media LLC
- Founder: William Hitchcock
- Founded: 1901
- Language: English
- Headquarters: 600 S. Sixth Street; Sunnyside, WA 98944
- Circulation: 3,818 (as of 2022)
- OCLC number: 1078787377
- Website: sunnysidesun.com

The Sunnyside Sun is a weekly newspaper published on Wednesdays in Sunnyside, Washington. The paper had a 3,000 print and e-edition subscribers as of 2018. The Sun is the newspaper of record for Sunnyside and covers community events, sports and local news.

== History ==
The Sunnyside Sun was founded in 1901 by William Hitchcock, a member of a group of Dunkards who were migrating from South Dakota in search of a site for a Christian Cooperative Colony. They purchased the townsite in 1900 and soon founded the Sun, along with various other institutions. It was a weekly paper. That same year, it was identified as one of four Washington papers that refused to publish advertisements for saloons.

In 1914, Yancey Freeman of the Sun was elected vice president of the Yakima-Benton-Kittitas Press Association, an organization newly formed to obtain uniform advertising rates in the Yakima valley. A. S. Hillyer of the Sun was the first speaker featured at the annual convention of the Washington State Press Association in 1922. Also in 1922, the Sun joined with other Washington newspapers to advocate for the McNary–Haugen Farm Relief Bill. The newspapers' testimony was entered into the Congressional Record of the 67th Congress.

In his History of the Yakima Valley (1919), William Denison Lyman described the Sun as "one of the strongest weekly papers in the valley." The book identified William Hitchcock as the founder and longtime proprietor, and stated that in 1909 the management changed. Hillyer was the editor and manager as of that date. The newspaper's contents were used as a basis for comparing the relative wealth and population of towns in its part of the Yakima Valley.

Hillyer joined with leaders of other Yakima Valley news organizations in 1948 to develop an educational program for students in the local 4-H Club to learn about the news business. The event was intended to be repeated annually.

In 1959, the paper had an audited circulation of 1,288.

The Sunnyside Sun absorbed the weekly Sunnyside Times in 1962. The paper was acquired by the Oregon-based Eagle Newspapers in 1984. Eagle bought the competing Daily News as well, and merged the two in 1986 to form the Daily Sun News. Daily publication began with Vol.1 in 1986 and ceased with Vol. 117 in 2018. After the paper's sale to Andy McNab in 2018, the name was changed back to Sunnyside Sun. In April 2024, owner Andy McNab sold the Sunnyside Sun to Ileana Martinez and Job Wise. The two were long-time employees of the paper and used a loan from the city to help fund the acquisition.

== Achievements ==
- In 2002, the Daily Sun News collaborated with Sunnyside Museum to produce a commemorative book, A Pictorial History of Sunnyside Washington. The book features historic photos of Sunnyside.
- In 2011, a design specialist and photographer of the Daily Sun News won seven awards between them from the Washington Better Newspaper Contest hosted by Washington Newspaper Publishers Association.
