= West Linn Tidings =

Weekly newspaper published in West Linn, Oregon

- Type: Weekly newspaper
- Owner: Carpenter Media Group
- Founder: Joseph W. Blaha
- Publisher: J. Brian Moniha
- Editor: Patrick Malee
- Founded: 1981
- Circulation: 5,560 (as of 2022)
- Website: westlinntidings.com

The West Linn Tidings is a weekly newspaper published in West Linn, Oregon, United States, a suburb of Portland. It is owned by the Carpenter Media Group. From 2000 to 2024, it was owned by the Pamplin Media Group. A 2014 Daily Beast story noted the amusing crime blotter stories in the Tidings as well as the neighboring Lake Oswego Review. As of 2017, the Tidings had a partnership with KOIN, a local television station.

== History ==
In 1981, Joe Blaha, who worked at Eagle Newspapers, founded the West Linn Tidings. In 1987, the newspaper was merged along with the Lake Oswego Review into Times Publishing Co. a subsidiary of The Guard Publishing Co. which owned The Register-Guard. The joint venture with Eagle was called Community Newspapers, Inc. The business was sold to Steve Clark in 1996. Pamplin Media Group bought the paper along with ten others in August 2000. Robert B. Pamplin Jr. sold his newspaper company in June 2024 to Carpenter Media Group.

== See also ==
- List of newspapers in Oregon
