= Eagle Newspapers (Oregon) =

American newspaper publisher

- Company type: Privately held company
- Industry: Media
- Founded: 1948
- Founder: Elmo Smith
- Defunct: 2020
- Headquarters: 4901 Indian School Rd NE, Salem OR 97309-0008
- Revenue: $8 million (1978-79)
- Owner: Denny Smith
- Number of employees: 350 (1980)
- Website: eaglenewspapers.com

Eagle Newspapers was an American newspaper publisher serving the states of Oregon, Washington and Idaho. The company originated in 1948 when Elmo Smith purchased the Blue Mountain Eagle. He would later sell the paper but the company's name would be derived from that title. Smith served a partial term as Oregon Governor and upon his death the business was managed by his son Denny Smith, who rapidly grew it from three newspapers to nearly twenty in the span of two decades. By 1985, Eagle Newspapers publications accounted for nearly one-half of the weekly newspapers sold each week in Oregon. The company sold off its last paper in 2020.

== History ==
=== Origins (1933 to 1968) ===
The origins of the company date back to 1933 when Elmo Smith and his wife, Dorothy, borrowed $25 to establish a mimeographed pennysaver in Ontario, Oregon. In 1936, the couple bought a press and founded the Eastern Oregon Observer. Smith sold the newspaper in December 1946 to Jessica Longston and Robert Pollock. He used the proceeds in 1948 to purchase the Blue Mountain Eagle in John Day, Oregon. That same year Smith and his friend Bill Robinson purchased The Madras Pioneer and the family business was incorporated as Blue Mountain Eagle Newspapers, Inc. A few months later Oscar W. Lange Jr. bought into the Pioneer as a third owner. In 1961, the company purchased the Hood River News and the Polk County Itemizer-Observer in 1964. Smith became a co-owner of the Albany Democrat-Herald in 1957 and purchased the Cottage Grove Sentinel in 1961, but these two papers were held separately from BME. The Blue Mountain Eagle was sold In 1968 to Donna and John Moreau.

=== Expansion (1968 to 2004) ===
Elmo Smith died in 1968 and the company was inherited by his son Denny Smith. At the time he worked as a pilot for Pan American Airlines and had served as a jet fighter pilot in the Vietnam War. Revenue then was $500,000 annually. The new owner set a goal of buying 10 newspapers as a way to cut overall costs through consolidation and to create more opportunities for employees to advance. Smith, in most cases, would buy papers on a 10-year contract for amounts ranging from the annual gross of sales to 1.3 times that amount. BME purchased the Central Oregonian in 1969. A year later the company moved its headquarters in 1970 from Dallas to Salem after a gas leak led to an explosion that destroyed its printing plant. The Eagle Web Press in Salem was completed in 1971.

The company acquired the Independence Enterprise-Herald and the Woodburn Independent in 1971, the Canby Herald in 1972 and Goldendale Sentinel in 1974. BME purchased the Polk Sun of Monmouth in 1975 from Frank Parchman, and then merged it with the Independence Enterprise-Herald to form the Sun-Enterprise. Smith did this because the Sun was losing $1,800 a month. A year later BME merged operations with the owners of the North Willamette News of Aurora in 1976. The deal included the Molalla Pioneer and Wilsonville News along combing the operations of BME-owned newspapers Canby Herald and Woodburn Independent. In 1978, BME purchased the Sheridan Sun and Lake Oswego Review.

The company's name was shortened to Eagle Newspapers, Inc. in 1979 when it merged with newspaper publishing companies in Hood River and Hermiston. The new group comprised 16 papers with a total circulation of 55,286. Annual revenue at that time was $7 million and 361 employees were on the payroll. Eagle pooled resources with G. M. "Jerry" Reed, who owned the Hermiston Herald and Heppner Gazette-Times in a stock-for-stock exchange along with Dick Nafsinger, who owned the remaining shares in Hood River News which had been operating as a subsidiary of Eagle. The Hood River chain also owned The Dalles Reminder, the Goldendale Sentinel and White Salmon Enterprise. That same year Eagle launched the free weekly Tualatin Valley Observer, which ceased after three years. A few months later Reed sold off the Gazette-Times. In 1980, Eagle obtained ownership of the Camas-Washougal Post-Record through a merger.

By 1980, Eagle owned five printing plants in Salem, Camas, Hermiston, Hood River and Prineville. About 10% of revenue came from commercial printing. In an interview, Smith said weeklies tended to underprice themselves, and that his chain through economies of scale was able to create a successful enterprise. In 1981, Joe Blaha, who worked at Eagle, founded the West Linn Tidings. That same year Eagle acquired the Idaho County Free Press and sold the Sheridan Sun to its publisher. In 1984, Eagle bought the Sunnyside Sun and sold the Goldendale Sentinel to A.J. and Lynda McNab. That same year Jerry Reed divested from Eagle Newspapers and regained full ownership of the Hermiston Herald. In 1985, the company purchased the Newberg Graphic and founded the Wilsonville Spokesman.

Also in 1985, Eagle entered into an agreement with The Guard Publishing Co., which owned The Register-Guard, to manage its five weekly newspapers in Washington County. The papers were operated by its subsidiary Times Publishing Co. and included the Valley Times in Beaverton, Tigard Times, Tualatin Times, Forest Grove News-Times and Cornelius Times. In 1987, the Lake Oswego Review (which also published the Lake Oswego Review and West Linn Tidings) was merged into Times Publishing Co. and Eagle obtained part ownership of the new joint venture, which was called Community Newspapers, Inc. The business was sold to Steve Clark in 1996. Eagle purchased the Daily News of Sunnyside and merged it with Sunnyside Sun in 1986 to form the Daily Sun News.

Denny Smith ran to be the republican nominee for Oregon governor in 1994 and Eagle Newspapers loaned his campaign $250,000. Smith ran on the success of his company, which at that time owned 20 weeklies and five printing presses. At that time, Smith owned $5.8 million worth of stock in Eagle. When Smith inherited the business from his father, annual gross sales were $500,000. He grew it to more than $18 million by the time he ran for governor through rapid expansion in the '70s and '80s. However, Robert W. Chandler attributed Eagle's success to its president Dick Nafsinger, a claim which both Smith and Nafsinger disputed. A year later Eagle also bought Daily Shipping News in 1995, The Omak-Okanogan County Chronicle in 1996, and The Dalles Chronicle from Pulitzer in 1996.

=== Sell-off (2004 to 2020) ===
In October 2004, the company sold the Camas-Washougal Post-Record to The Columbian Publishing Co. In January 2013, Eagle sold six newspapers in Central Oregon and the Willamette Valley to the Pamplin Media Group. The sale included the Canby Herald, Madras Pioneer, Molalla Pioneer, Newberg Graphic, Wilsonville Spokesman and Woodburn Independent. In June 2013, Eagle also sold Pamplin the Central Oregonian and its printing facility in Prineville.

In 2018, the company sold the Daily Sun News to Andy McNab, who renamed it back to the Sunnyside Sun. A year later Eagle sold the Idaho County Free Press in Grangeville to the paper's publisher Sarah Klement. The Omak-Okanogan County Chronicle was also sold in 2019 to the paper's manager J. Louis Mullen.

Due to the COVID-19 recession in the United States, Eagle Newspapers announced plans to shutter the Hood River News, The Dalles Chronicle and the White Salmon Enterprise. Instead the paper's publisher Chelsea Marr purchased them in March 2020. The three were combined to form the Columbia Gorge News on April 8.

In April 2020, the company sold the Polk County Itemizer-Observer to SJ Olson Publishing, Inc.

== Newspapers formerly published by Eagle ==
Title	Year acquired	Year sold or closed	Fate
Blue Mountain Eagle	1948	1968	Sold to John Moreau
The Madras Pioneer	1948	2013	Sold to Pamplin Media Group
Hood River News	1961	2020	Sold to Chelsea Marr
Polk County Itemizer-Observer	1964	2020	Sold to Scott Olson
Central Oregonian	1969	2013	Sold to Pamplin Media Group
Woodburn Independent	1971	2013	Sold to Pamplin Media Group
Independence Enterprise-Herald	1971	1975	Merged with Polk Sun to form Sun-Enterprise
Canby Herald	1972	2013	Sold to Pamplin Media Group
Goldendale Sentinel	1974	1984	Sold to Andy McNab
Polk Sun of Monmouth	1975	1975	Merged with Enterprise Herald to form Sun-Enterprise
Sun-Enterprise	1975	1992	Merged into Polk County Itemizer-Observer
White Salmon Enterprise	1976	2020	Sold to Chelsea Marr
Molalla Pioneer	1976	2013	Sold to Pamplin Media Group
Wilsonville News	1976		
North Willamette News of Aurora	1976		
The Dalles Reminder	1978	1996	Merged into The Dalles Chronicle
Sheridan Sun	1978	1981	Sold to George Robertson
Lake Oswego Review	1978	1987	Ownership transferred to Community Newspapers, Inc.
Hermiston Herald	1979	1984	Herald owner Jerry Reed divested from Eagle Newspapers
Heppner Gazette-Times	1979	1979	Sold to Jerome Sheldon
Tualatin Valley Observer	1979	1982	Closed
Camas-Washougal Post-Record	1980	2004	Sold to The Columbian Publishing Co.
West Linn Tidings	1981	1987	Ownership transferred to Community Newspapers, Inc.
Idaho County Free Press	1981	2018	Sold to Sarah Klement
Wilsonville Spokesman	1985	2013	Sold to Pamplin Media Group
Sunnyside Sun	1984	1986	Merged with Daily News to form Daily Sun News
Newberg Graphic	1985	1987	Ownership transferred to Community Newspapers, Inc.
Daily News of Sunnyside	1986	1986	Merged with Sunnyside Sun to form Daily Sun News
Daily Sun News	1986	2018	Sold to Andy McNab
Daily Shipping News	1995		
The Omak-Okanogan County Chronicle	1996	2019	Sold to J. Louis Mullen
The Dalles Chronicle	1996	2020	Sold to Chelsea Marr
Vancouver Value Clipper	2003		

== See also ==
- List of companies based in Oregon
