= Hood River Glacier =

- Type: Weekly newspaper
- Founder: George T. Prather
- Founded: 1889
- Ceased publication: 1933
- Language: English
- City: Hood River, Oregon
- ISSN: 2379-3287
- OCLC number: 39319148

The Hood River Glacier was a newspaper serving Hood River in the U.S. state of Oregon from 1889 to 1933.

== History ==
George T. Prather came to Oregon from Kansas in 1857. He became the first groom in Hood River when he married in 1883, and was appointed postmaster of the city in 1886. He founded the Hood River Glacier on June 8, 1889. Its founder claimed that profit was not a motive, stating that he would be satisfied if the paper covered its own expenses. Samuel F. Blythe bought the paper in 1894. After enlarging the paper, Blythe sold it to Arthur D. Moe in 1904.

In 1921, the Glacier was named the best newspaper in Oregon, with its rival Hood River News taking second place, in a contest conducted by the Oregon Agricultural College. (The Enterprise Record Chieftain took third place).

Walter H. Walton, an editor of the Glacier, also edited the rival Hood River News and the Better Fruit publication. A. D. Moe, who by coincidence was married (in Wisconsin) on the same day the Glacier was launched, later served as its publisher for 27 years. He was succeeded by his sons, Roger W. and Mark E. Moe. In 1933, the Moe brothers purchased the Dufur Dispatch, founded 1894. Joe D. Thomison was Glacier editor in 1933, and may have also served as publisher.

The Hood River Glacier ceased in November 1933 after the Moes gave their printing plant to credit union. The paper's founder Prather died May 1934 and the Glacier never resumed production. The Glacier's property was acquired by the Hood River News, who placed the paper's archive in the county library for public reference. In 1936, the Dam Chronicle moved into the offices in the First National Bank building formerly occupied by the Glacier.

== Legacy ==
Author Doris J. Smith incorporated clippings from the Glacier, along with the Dalles Optimist and the Mosier Bulletin, into a publication of the journal of Mary Evans, Wasco County pioneer. The book, published in 2010, was titled I Am All Alone.

In 2013, The Dalles Chronicle reported plans to digitize early issues of the Glacier, along with selections from its own archives and that of the Maupin Times. Funding came from the National Endowment for Humanities' National Digital Newspaper Program (NDNP), and the Glacier's coverage of Japanese immigration to the Columbia River Gorge and the birth of Hood River County's fruit industry influenced its selection as a top priority Oregon paper. In 2016, the University of Oregon made nearly 1,650 issues of the paper converted into digital replicas accessible online via its Oregon Digital Newspaper Program.
