= The Omak-Okanogan County Chronicle =

The Okanogan County Chronicle
- Type: Weekly newspaper
- Format: Broadsheet
- Owner(s): Thomas and Ann Mullen; Teresa Myers
- Publisher: Teresa Myers
- Managing editor: Brock Hires
- Founded: May 20, 1910
- Language: English
- Headquarters: 618 Okoma Drive, Omak, WA 98841
- Circulation: 6,900 (as of 2022)
- ISSN: 1064-2617
- OCLC number: 17319982
- Website: omakchronicle.com

The Okanogan County Chronicle is a newspaper serving North-Central Washington's Okanogan County. The weekly newspaper also covers Ferry County and portions of Douglas County. The newspaper's primary readership is on the U.S. Route 97 corridor stretching from Pateros, Wash., north to the U.S.–Canada border.

Teresa Myers has served as the publisher and advertising manager since 2015. The newspaper produced a joint weekend publication with The Wenatchee World from 2011 to 2021.

== History ==
The Omak Chronicle was first published on May 20, 1910. It was founded by Clarence P. Scates, who previously worked as a reporter at the Spokane Chronicle. Frank A. DeVos traveled by canoe for nine hours from Oroville to Omak to come work at the paper in 1913. Two years later he acquired The Omak Publishing Co.

At that time the Chronicle struggled financially under DeVos, with one nearby paper writing: "In fact, no paper in the county more loyally and earnestly boosts for its home town than does the Chronicle. The people of that place, however, do not seem to appreciate what the Chronicle is doing for them judging from the meagre support extended to the paper."

In 1926, the Chronicle and another paper based in Pateros were purchased by Frank S. Emert, owner of the Oroville Gazette. He operate the Chronicle for decades until selling it in 1957 to Bruce A. Wilson, president of the Washington Newspaper Publishers Association and co-owner of the Ritzville Journal-Times. John E. Andrist became the paper's owner in 1970. Its name was changed to The Omak-Okanogan County Chronicle in 1973. Andrist owned the paper until 1996. At that time Eagle Newspapers purchased and operated the newspaper until selling it to J. Louis Mullen in 2019. Ownership later changed to Thomas and Ann Mullen, and publisher Teresa Myers. The paper was soon renamed to The Okanogan County Chronicle. On March 31, 2026, the Chronicle purchased the assets of The Okanogan Valley Gazette-Tribune from Sound Publishing.
