= Goldendale Sentinel =

US newspaper covering Goldendale Washington and Klicktat County

- Thanksgiving 2020 cover
- Type: Weekly newspaper
- Owner(s): Tartan Publications, Inc.
- Founder(s): C. K. and K. A. Seitz
- Publisher: Lou Marzeles
- Founded: 1879
- Language: English
- Headquarters: 117 West Main Street; Goldendale, WA
- Circulation: 3,200 (as of 2022)
- OCLC number: 17311643
- Website: goldendalesentinel.com

The Goldendale Sentinel is a newspaper that covers local news about Goldendale and the surrounding Klickitat county region of the U.S. state of Washington. It is the oldest paper in eastern Washington. It is recognized by Klickitat County as a community media source. Lou Marzeles is the paper's editor/publisher and the owner is Leslie Geatches.

== History ==
In 1877, The Sun newspaper briefly published in Goldendale, Washington. The paper quickly shuttered and the printing plant was sold to C. K. and K. A. Seitz. They published the first issue of the Klickitat Sentinel in 1879 with an estimated hundred copies. Throughout its early history the Sentinel struggled financially at some points. It was rumored to have used wallpaper for one edition when newsprint didn't come in time from The Dalles.

In 1880, the Goldendale Gazette was founded by Captain W. A. Wash, a former Confederate States Army officer. It was a rival with Sentinel until Wash sold it to stock company on May 14, 1885, and the two papers merged to form the Goldendale Sentinel. Attorney Ralph O. Dunbar then managed the paper for about six years. In 1888, a fire swept through Goldendale destroying all but three buildings, leaving 25 families homeless. While the paper's office was destroyed and the fire caused $3,500 worth of damage to the business, the Sentinel still managed to print by using the facilities of The Dalles Mountaineer.

In 1893, the stockholders hired W. F. Byars to manage the Sentinel. He bought stock over time and sold the paper in May 1907 to brothers Ed Ward and N. L. Ward. On October 1, 1910, the Wards sold the paper to Mr. Irving S. Bath and Mr. D. W. Bath. On June 1, 1936, Archie Radcliffe and Harold Fariello purchased the Sentinel from Irving S. Bath and consolidated it with the Klickitat County News. Fariello later bought Radcliffe out in 1947.

In 1956, Harold and Mabel Fariello sold the paper to Pete and Eleanor May. In 1974, the couple sold the paper to Eagle Newspapers. The company sold the paper to A.J. and Lynda McNab ten years later. In 2010, the Goldendale Sentinel was purchased by Leslie Geatches.
