= The Bee (Portland newspaper) =

Monthly newspaper published in Portland, Oregon

Sellwood Bee
- Type: Monthly newspaper
- Format: Broadsheet
- Owner: Carpenter Media Group
- Publisher: J. Brian Monihan
- Editor: Eric Norberg
- Founded: 1906
- Headquarters: 1837 S.E. Harold St, Portland, OR United States
- Circulation: 18,400 (as of 2022)
- OCLC number: 55663345
- Website: readthebee.com thebeenews.com

The Bee is a newspaper based in Sellwood, a neighborhood of Portland in the U.S. state of Oregon. It was founded as the Sellwood Bee in 1906, and at various times has been known as Bee, the Milwaukee Bee, and the Sellwood-Moreland Bee. It returned to simply the Bee in 1970, and has retained the name since.

The Bee was mentioned in Rowell's American Newspaper Directory the year after it launched. From its earliest days until recent history, the Bee has earned favorable mentions, as well as quotation or republication in, publications ranging from those in nearby St. Johns (which had common ownership with the Bee for some years) to papers elsewhere in Oregon, and occasionally as far away as Iowa.

At the time of the Bee's founding, Sellwood had 5,000 to 6,000 residents. The paper was founded as a weekly publication with an annual subscription cost of US$1. Citing boycotts and labor costs, founders Charles Ballard and C. T. Price moved the Bee to neighboring Milwaukie about four months into publication, changing its name to the Milwaukee Bee (with an incorrect spelling); but they returned to Sellwood eight months later, to offices the paper would occupy until the 1990s. Ballard sold his share to C. M. Thompson in 1907. Thompson and Price had some success in building up the paper, and used its pages to advocate for business interests in Sellwood's development. John P. Locke, who also owned the Nob Hill News of Northwest Portland, bought the paper in 1920, but kept Thompson on as publisher. The publisher as of 1939 was C. M. Thompson.

The paper's title was originally the Sellwood Bee (most of 1906–49); The Milwaukee Bee (briefly, during its first year); The Sellwood-Moreland Bee (1949–70); and simply The Bee (1917–18 and 1970–present)

Marcia and Tom Pry purchased the Bee in 1974 and built it into a chain of seven local papers. Marcia Pry was well known, among other things the first woman president of the Oregon Newspapers Publishing Association. The Prys also funded the launch of a long-running music magazine, The Two Louies.

The Prys sold the paper to MR Communications Group in March 1994. By December, MR announced it would shut down the Bee, and that it had sold three other Portland papers it had purchased (St. Johns Review, the oldest weekly community newspaper in Portland; Northwest Neighbor, a monthly community newspaper started in 1975 by former mayor Bud Clark; and the Hollywood Star). Teresa Wood Smith purchased the paper, preventing its demise, in 1995, and John and Carol Dillin purchased it from her in 1996.

The Pamplin Media Group bought the paper from the Dillins in 2000, a purchase that was announced concurrently with its acquisition of 10 other newspapers.

In 2006 the Bee published a four-page, 100-year anniversary retrospective.
