= Idaho County Free Press =

Weekly newspaper published in Grangeville, Idaho

Coordinates: 45°55′34″N 116°07′52″W

- Type: Weekly newspaper
- Format: Broadsheet
- Owner: Sarah Klement
- Founder(s): Aaron F. Parker; G.E. Beeson
- Founded: June 18, 1886
- Language: English
- Headquarters: 407 West Main Street; Grangeville, Idaho, U.S. 83530
- ISSN: 0746-8881
- OCLC number: 13137622
- Website: idahocountyfreepress.com

The Idaho County Free Press is a weekly newspaper based in Grangeville, Idaho. Established in 1886, it serves as the primary news outlet for Idaho County, which is the largest county by land area in the state. The publication focuses on local governance, agriculture, mining history, and community events within the Camas Prairie and surrounding regions.

== History ==
The first issue of the Idaho County Free Press was published on June 18, 1886. It was founded by editor Aaron F. Parker with G.E. Beeson. Parker, a veteran of the Nez Perce War and a former newspaperman from Lewiston, moved to Grangeville specifically to advocate against the annexation of North Idaho by Washington state. At the time, the regional debate over statehood and territorial boundaries was a central political issue, and Parker used the Free Press as a platform for his anti-annexation campaign.

In 1900, Parker sold the paper to Elmer McBroom, followed in ownership by Lloyd A. Wisener in 1907, and James Clifford Safley in 1917. Safley bought and absorbed a rival paper called the Grangeville Globe in 1923, and sold the Free Press to E.M. Olmsted in 1924. In 1949, E.M. "Pop" Olmsted died after operating the paper for 24 years. The Free Press was then published by his sons Eugene Q. Olmsted and John L. Olmsted, who sold it to Robert D. Stolley in 1973. Stolley sold the paper to Eagle Newspapers in 1981. Three decades later, the Oregon-based chain sold the Free Press to its publisher Sarah Klement in 2019.

== Historical archive ==
The Idaho County Free Press has historical archives, providing a record of the development of North-Central Idaho. During the late 19th century, the paper served as a communication link for remote mining camps, often reporting on the arrival of mail carriers and stagecoaches traveling through mountain passes. In 1976, the paper produced a "Bicentennial Edition" that serves as a primary reference for the seventeen original mining districts of Idaho County.

The publication remains a "legal newspaper" for the county, meaning it is the official venue for public notices and government transparency. It continues to operate as a weekly print edition with a digital presence.
