= The Outlook (Gresham) =

Weekly newspaper published in Gresham, Oregon

- Type: Weekly newspaper
- Owner: Carpenter Media Group (since 2024)
- Founder: Harry L. St. Clair
- Managing editor: Steve Brown
- Founded: 1911
- Language: English
- City: Gresham, Oregon, U.S.
- Circulation: 9,068 (as of 2022)
- Sister newspapers: Sandy Post
- OCLC number: 30722087
- Website: theoutlookonline.com

The Outlook is a weekly newspaper published in Gresham, Oregon, a suburb of Portland in the U.S. state of Oregon. It was founded in 1911. It was owned by the Pamplin Media Group from 2000 to 2024, and since 2024 has been owned by Carpenter Media Group.

== History ==
On March 3, 1911, Harry L. St. Clair, a pastor turned printer, founded the Gresham Outlook after having previously worked at the Beaver State Herald. At the time he lived in a small cottage, was several hundred dollars in debt and owned a single linotype machine. He ran the business with help of his wife and son. The Outlook Publishing Company was incorporated in 1917. The printing plant branched out in the '30s into producing shooting targets for the NRA, making 300,000 a year, along with printing the regional shooting magazine Windage.

St. Clair died in 1938 and the Outlook was passed to his family, who sold it in 1941 to Thomas Purcell. In 1960, Purcell sold the paper to Lee Irwin and Walt Taylor, and Irwin served as publisher from then until 1982. He was followed by Robert Caldwell for a relatively short period, with Steven J. Clark being named publisher effective April 4, 1983.

The paper was embroidered in controversy around 1981 after newsroom staff learned of a pyramid scheme involving Reynolds School District employees and didn't report the story until it was widely known to the public. Reader accused The Outlook of attempting a cover-up and wrote angry letters, canceled subscriptions or boycotted the paper. A city council member refused to talk to reporters anymore. Locals even went so far as to call the paper "The Outrage, The Overlook, The Cover-up."

Irwin and Taylor sold the Gresham Outlook in 1977 to the Democrat-Herald Publishing Co., which published the Albany Democrat-Herald. Capital Cities purchased the company in 1980, which itself was acquired by The Walt Disney Company in 1995. Disney sold its Oregon newspapers to Lee Enterprises in 1997, and three years later Lee sold The Outlook to Robert B. Pamplin, Jr. in 2000. Pamplin Media Group was sold in June 2024 to Carpenter Media Group. In June 2025, the paper's print schedule was decreased from twice to once a week. A month later the Sandy Post was absorbed into the paper. At that time the Outlook only had one reporter on staff.
