= Columbia Gorge News =

Weekly newspaper published in Hood River, Oregon

- Type: Weekly newspaper
- Owner(s): Columbia Gorge News, LLC
- Publisher: Chelsea Marr
- Editor: Trisha Walker
- Founded: December 10, 1890 (as The Dalles Chronicle)
- Language: English
- Headquarters: 600 E. Port Marina Way, Hood River, OR
- ISSN: 2996-6558
- OCLC number: 1246672441
- Website: columbiagorgenews.com

Columbia Gorge News is a weekly newspaper based in Hood River, Oregon. It covers communities throughout the Columbia River Gorge, including those in Wasco County, Oregon, and Klickitat County, Washington. It was formed in April 2020 by the merger of The Dalles Chronicle, Hood River News and White Salmon Enterprise after Eagle Newspapers sold them to Chelsea Marr. The paper has a circulation around 7,000 and publishes on Wednesdays. Columbia Gorge News is a member of the Oregon Newspaper Publishers Association.

== History ==
=== The Dalles Chronicle ===
The Dalles Chronicle was first published on December 10, 1890. The paper had many managers and owners in its early days. In 1906, Ben R. Litfin arrived in The Dalles three days before Christmas with 20 cents in his pocket. He would go on to "become publisher of a newspaper which he developed beyond the dreams of any of his predecessor." Litfin become a part-owner in 1909. Clarence Hedges acquired the paper in 1915. Litfin became a co-owner again in 1920, and then the sole owner in 1923.

The Dalles Chronicle logo

Litfin would be remembered for "gradually turning the pile of junk he found into a living, breathing, fighting newspaper." When advertisers threatened to boycott his paper for publishing a divorce story about a prominent business man, Litfin refused to yield, saying "I'm going to print the news. I'm going to make my paper so widely read that you'll have to buy space in its columns. And if you want to boycott, I'll fill up the columns with Portland advertising."

In 1933, the Chronicle acquired the property of the defunct Hood River Glacier. A fire caused $40,000 worth of damage to the paper's office in 1946. Litfin sold the Chronicle in 1947 to Victor J. Morgan and died three years later. The Chronicle was then acquired by Robert S. Howard in December 1948. Scripps League Newspapers became a co-owner with Howard in June 1949, with the joint-venture called Western Publishing Company. Howard sold his interests to Scripps in 1955 so he could focus on establishing his own newspaper chain called Howard Publications. Scripps was acquired by Pulitzer in 1996, who then sold the Chronicle later that year to Eagle Newspapers. Eagle then merged The Dalles Reminder into The Dalles Chronicle.

=== Hood River News ===
Hood River News was founded in 1905. C. P. Sonnichsen and Hugh G. Ball bought the paper in 1908. Sonnichsen assumed the role of manager and Ball as editor. By 1912 the newspaper had 1,500 subscribers and transitioned from weekly to semiweekly. During his career, Ball headed the Oregon Newspaper Publishers Association and was on the board of directors for the National Editorial Association. He was skilled at his job, with one paper writing "Editor Ball has brought envy to the eye of many visiting editors with his ability to set editorials directly on the machine without need of copy." In 1961, E. A. Sonnichsen sold Hood River News to Eagle Newspapers.

=== White Salmon Enterprise ===
The White Salmon Enterprise began publishing in 1903. J. H. Ginder owned the paper for four years until selling it in 1908 to the Estee Investment Company. The Meresse family owned the Enterprise from 1912 until it was purchased by Hood River News on July 1, 1976, which was part of Eagle Newspapers.

=== Merger ===
Due to the COVID-19 recession in the United States, Eagle Newspapers announced plans to shutter the Hood River News, The Dalles Chronicle and the White Salmon Enterprise on March 31, 2020. Instead the papers' publisher Chelsea Marr purchased them. The three combined to form the Columbia Gorge News on April 8.
