= Pamplin Media Group =

Media conglomerate, operating primarily in the Portland metropolitan area

- Company type: Private
- Industry: Media
- Founded: 2001
- Founder: Robert B. Pamplin, Jr.
- Area served: Portland metropolitan area
- Owner: Carpenter Media Group
- Number of employees: 200
- Website: pamplinsubscribe.com

The Pamplin Media Group (PMG) is a media conglomerate owned by Carpenter Media Group and operating primarily in the Portland metropolitan area in the U.S. state of Oregon. Robert B. Pamplin, Jr. founded the company in 2001 and sold it to Carpenter in 2024. As of 2019, the company owns 25 newspapers and employs 200 people.

Each chain writes and edits its own stories and shares them with each other and several subscribers, including newspapers in Medford, Corvallis, and Albany.

== History ==
Robert B. Pamplin, Jr. purchased Community Newspapers, Inc. in August 2000. The sale included eleven newspapers in the Portland suburbs (Beaverton Valley Times, Forest Grove News-Times, Lake Oswego Review, Tigard Times, Tualatin Times, West Linn Tidings, Our Town, Sherwood Gazette and Southwest Community Connection). The total staff was about 130. The company also acquired the Sellwood Bee around that time in a separate sale. The papers were to be managed by Oregon Publications Corp., a subsidy of R.B. Pamplin Corp. The business' name was later changed to Pamplin Media Group.

In November 2000, the company bought four titles from Lee Enterprises. The sale included The Gresham Outlook, the Sandy Post and two monthly publications: The East County News and Lifestyles Northwest. In February 2001, Pamplin founded the Portland Tribune, which would serve as the media group's flagship title. In February 2005, Pamplin purchased the monthly newspaper King City Regal Courier from the Hieb family. In September 2012, the company launched the Hillsboro Tribune.

On January 8, 2013, Pamplin bought five newspapers from Eagle Newspapers, Inc. in the Portland area (Canby Herald, Wilsonville Spokesman, Molalla Pioneer, The Newberg Graphic, and the Woodburn Independent), along with The Madras Pioneer in Central Oregon. In June 2013, it also purchased the Central Oregonian from Eagle along with its printing facility in Prineville.

In 2014, Pamplin partnered with the EO Media Group, which publishes the East Oregonian and several other weekly and monthly publications in Oregon, to form the Oregon Capital Bureau and publish the Oregon Capital Insider newsletter. The partnership came as the number of reporters assigned to state capital bureaus nationwide was on the decline. That same year Pamplin launched the Business Tribune, a business newspaper published as an insert section in the Portland Tribune.

In 2018, the newly launched Salem Reporter joined the bureau, and its publisher, Les Zaitz, was assigned to lead its three reporters. The Salem Reporter left the cooperative in early 2020 and Zaitz left the operation. The Oregon Capital Bureau as of late winter 2020 includes just the EO Media Group and Pamplin. Also in 2018, Pamplin completed a $1 million expansion on its Gresham press plant.

In August 2019, the Hillsboro Tribune was merged into the Forest Grove News-Times. In January 2020, the Canby Herald and Molalla Pioneer were merged to form The Herald-Pioneer. In March that same year, about 20 newsroom employees were laid off and staff hours were reduced following a loss of revenue stemming from the COVID-19 recession in the United States. In July 2022, Pamplin announced it would no longer host a comments section on the articles published to its websites.

In April 2023, Pamplin launched YourOregonNews.com, which aggregates stories from all of its newspapers. That same year in June, Pamplin agreed to sell its 39,000-square-foot Milwaukie-area building headquarters to Clackamas County for $11 million. In August, the Clackamas Review switched from weekly to monthly publication and was renamed to the Milwaukie Review. The Oregon City News switched to monthly publication as well. In December 2023, Pamplin announced its Gresham printing plant would close the following month and about two dozen employees would lose their jobs. Pamplin shifted production of its newspapers to The Columbian's plant in Vancouver, Washington.

In June 2024, Pamplin was sold to Carpenter Media Group. Six weeks later an unknown number of employees were laid off, including longtime statehouse reporter Peter Wong. That same month the Sherwood Gazette ceased publication and the Estacada News was later shuttered. In June 2025, Carpenter laid off dozens of employees at its Oregon papers, including at least six newsroom workers at the Portland Tribune. A few days later, the company announced that three Pamplin papers, Portland Tribune, Oregon City News and Milwaukie Review, will cease print and be online only. The Gresham Outlook also had its print schedule decreased from twice to once a week. A month later the Sandy Post ceased after its only reporter was laid off. In March 2026, the Woodburn Independent and The Herald-Pioneer merged form The Herald-Independent.

== Newspapers ==
Newspapers owned by Pamplin Media Group
State	Service area	Newspaper
Oregon	Beaverton	Beaverton Valley Times
Oregon	Sellwood (Portland)	The Bee
Oregon	Canby	Canby Herald
Oregon	Prineville	Central Oregonian
Oregon	Clackamas	Clackamas Review
Oregon	Forest Grove	Forest Grove News-Times
Oregon	Hillsboro	Hillsboro Tribune
Oregon	Lake Oswego	Lake Oswego Review
Oregon	Madras	The Madras Pioneer
Oregon	Molalla	Molalla Pioneer
Oregon	Newberg	The Newberg Graphic
Oregon	Gresham	The Outlook
Oregon	Portland	Portland Tribune
Oregon	Sandy	Sandy Post
Oregon	Scappoose	Columbia County Spotlight
Oregon	Southwest Portland	Southwest Community Connection
Oregon	West Linn	West Linn Tidings
Oregon	Wilsonville	Wilsonville Spokesman
Oregon	Woodburn	Woodburn Independent
