= Heppner Gazette-Times =

Weekly newspaper published in Heppner, Oregon

- Type: Weekly newspaper
- Owner: David Sykes
- Founder: John A. Stine
- Publisher: Chris Sykes
- Editor: Andrea Di Salvo
- Founded: 1883
- Language: English
- Headquarters: 188 W. Willow, Heppner, OR
- Circulation: 1,430
- ISSN: 2835-7019
- OCLC number: 30721874
- Website: heppner.net

The Heppner Gazette-Times is a weekly newspaper serving Morrow County in the U.S. state of Oregon. It has a circulation of 1,430.

== History ==
The Heppner Gazette was established on March 30, 1883, by John A. Stine. It was the first newspaper published in Morrow County. At the time of its launch, the city of Heppner had a population of 370; the newspaper was started with contributions from a number of citizens. Stine brought a Washington handpress from Portland via railroad and set up shop in the pioneer town. He ran the paper for a short time before transferring his interests to Colonel John W. Redington, a former volunteer Indian scout who fought in the Bannock War. Redington was an eccentric who painted signs outside his shop that read "Hell on Horse Thieves and Hypocrites" and another proclaimed "The Heppner Gazette Bangup for Bustles."

Redington ran the paper for five years and was succeeded by Rev. Henry Rasmus, church pastor at Heppner Methodist Episcopal. Within the year he was replaced by teacher Otis Patterson. He ran the paper with his brother Alva until 1898. Editorship was then passed to Corliss Merritt, then back to Redington in 1900. A year later the Gazette was sold in 1901 to Fred Warnock, formerly of the Silverton Appeal, and E. P. Mitchell. Warnock later bought out Mitchell. In 1910, Vawter Crawford, formerly of the Morrow County Record, purchased the Gazette.

The Heppner Times was established on Nov. 18, 1897 by E. M. Shutt. Shutt got into a fist fight on Main Street with rival newsman Redington of the Gazette in March 1901 and "thrashed" him. Redington had published a story claiming Shutt was attracted to a woman he employed. Shutt, the larger of the two, flattened Redington in a rage. Shutt ran the Times until he was elected sheriff in 1902. He sold the paper to A. J. Hicks who ran if for about a decade before selling it back to Shutt. Vawter Crawford purchased the Times and consolidated it with the Gazette to form the Heppner Gazette-Times on Feb. 15, 1912. It was a consistently Republican newspaper throughout its early history. Part of the merger announcement read: "We do not enter upon this new venture with the idea that we have a picnic, or that it is a bonanza. But we do take up the work with new energy and sincere pride."

Vawter Crawford died in April 1935. The Gazette-Times was inherited by his son Spencer Crawford, who died in 1942. The paper was then operated by Vawter's brother Otheo G. Crawford, who sold the paper in 1951 to Mr. and Mrs. Robert Penland, formerly of the Lebanon Express. Almost a decade later the couple sold the paper in 1961 to Mr. and Mrs. W. O. Wildman, who less than a year later sold it to Wesley A. Sherman and his wife Helen. After her husband suffered a fatal heart attack in 1969 while on a visit to Washington D.C., Helen Sherman operated the Gazette-Times herself. The former teacher worked 80 hours a week to keep the paper functioning. Charlie and Dorothy Heard become the owner around that time. In 1973, Ernest V. Joiner purchased the Gazette-Times from the Heards. Joiner sold the paper in 1976 to G. M. Reed, owner of The Hermiston Herald. In March 1979, Reed merged his business with Eagle Newspapers. He then sold the Gazette-Times to Jerome Sheldon in August 1979. In 1980, Jane and Jerome Sheldon sold the paper to David Sykes. About four decades later he appointed his son Chris Sykes as publisher in 2022.

== Archive ==
Archives from 1951 through 1976, as well as many pages from its predecessor newspapers, are available through the Oregon Digital Newspaper Program at the University of Oregon.
