= Robert B. Pamplin =

American businessman (1911–2009)

Robert B. Pamplin Sr.
- Pamplin in 1976
- Born: November 25, 1911; Dinwiddie County, Virginia, U.S.
- Died: June 24, 2009 (aged 97); Dunthorpe, Oregon, U.S.
- Education: Virginia Polytechnic Institute
- Occupation: Businessman
- Known for: President & chairman of Georgia-Pacific
- Spouse: Mary Katherine Reese (m. 1940-2008)
- Children: Robert B. Pamplin Jr.

Robert Boisseau Pamplin (November 25, 1911 – June 24, 2009) was an American businessman and later philanthropist. A native of Virginia, he rose through the ranks of Georgia-Pacific where he later served as president and chairman of the board. He helped relocate the company to Portland, Oregon, where he retired and resided until his death.

== Early life ==
He was born on a small family farm in Dinwiddie County, Virginia, to Pauline Beville and John Robert Pamplin, attended Midway High School in Dinwiddie County, and in the fall of 1929 began attending Virginia Polytechnic Institute (VPI). While at VPI, he was enrolled in the Corps of Cadets. He graduated from VPI with a B.S. degree in Business Administration in 1933 and spent one year in graduate school studying business administration at Northwestern University. He married Mary Katherine Reese on June 15, 1940, in Augusta, Georgia. They had one son, Robert B. Pamplin Jr., born on September 3, 1941, in Augusta.

== Career ==
In 1934, Pamplin joined Georgia Hardwood in Augusta, Georgia, as one of five employees. In 1946, Georgia Hardwood was renamed Georgia-Pacific. He successively worked as accountant, secretary and treasurer, financial vice president, and president of Georgia-Pacific. In 1954, the company re-located its headquarters to Portland, Oregon, partly in response to Pamplin's suggestion. Owen Robertson Cheatham, founder of Georgia-Pacific, asked him to move west with the company. He had a personal conflict working with Lewis A. Pick (former Army Lt. General and VPI alumni) at Georgia-Pacific and terminated his employment on July 1, 1955.

After taking time off and traveling in Canada, he returned to Georgia-Pacific and served as President of the company from 1957 until his retirement in 1976. Robert B. Pamplin took Georgia-Pacific through a period of tremendous growth. When he started as President in 1957, annual sales were $121 million and profits were $7.4 million. At the time of his retirement, Georgia Pacific had sales of $3 billion and profits of $215 million.

== Later life ==
He created the R. B. Pamplin Corporation in 1957 in Portland, Oregon. He contributed greatly to his alma mater VPI, now known as Virginia Tech. Pamplin Hall at VPI was named in his honor in 1969 and the Pamplin College of Business Administration was named for him in 1988. His wife died in December 2008. Robert Pamplin died on June 24, 2009, at his home in Dunthorpe, Oregon, near Portland at the age of 97.

== Honors ==
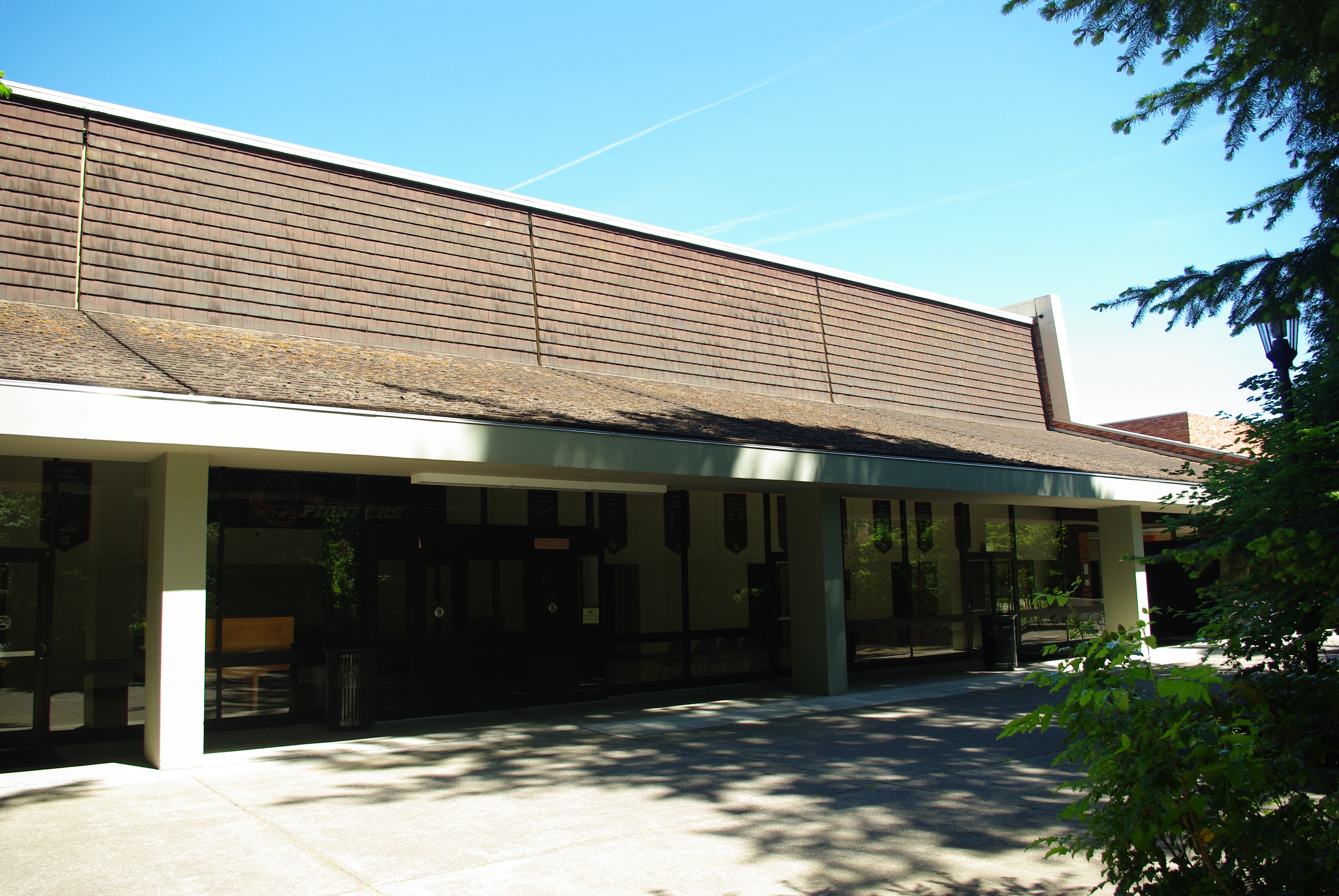
Pamplin Sports Center

- Robert B. Pamplin Sr. received Northwestern University's Merit Award in 1966.
- The indoor athletic facility at Lewis & Clark College in Portland, Oregon was named the Pamplin Sports Center in 1968.
- Served on the Board of Trustees of Virginia Polytechnic Institute from 1971 to 1979.
- Awarded the Honorary Doctor of Laws degree by the University of Portland in 1972.
- Awarded the Virginia Polytechnic Institute and State University Alumni Distinguished Service Award in 1973.
- Named the Virginian of the Year by the Virginia Press Association in 1976.

== See also ==
- Mount Vernon Mill No. 3
