= McKenzie River Reflections =

Weekly newspaper published in McKenzie Bridge, Oregon

- Type: Weekly newspaper
- Founder: Ellen Louise Engelman
- Publisher: Ken Engelman
- Founded: 1978
- Language: English
- Headquarters: 59059 Old McKenzie Hwy. McKenzie Bridge, OR 97413
- OCLC number: 22916162
- Website: mckenzieriverreflectionsnewspaper.com

McKenzie River Reflections is a newspaper serving eastern Lane County in the U.S. state of Oregon since 1978. It is published weekly on Wednesdays, and has a circulation of about 700.

== Overview ==
The paper is known for colorful local news, gardening tips and columns like "Ridin' the Rapids." Its founder and editor, Ellen Louise Engelman, died in September 2020. Her husband Ken Engelman, who had previously served as publisher, succeeded her as editor; he is on the board of the McKenzie Discovery Center.

In August 2022, the paper launched an E-edition and encouraged customers to switch over from print. At the time the paper had 725 mail subscribers. As of July 2024, the paper had 704 digital subscribers and produces 100 print editions a week. The change saved the paper $40,000 annually.

In April 2026, someone gained access to the paper's Facebook page, renamed it to "Marketing AI Lexi,” and began making posts focused on products. Publisher Ken Engelman filed a complaint to Meta Platforms and the page with its 4,000 followers was soon deleted. The paper then launched a new page.
