= Sheridan Sun =

The Sun
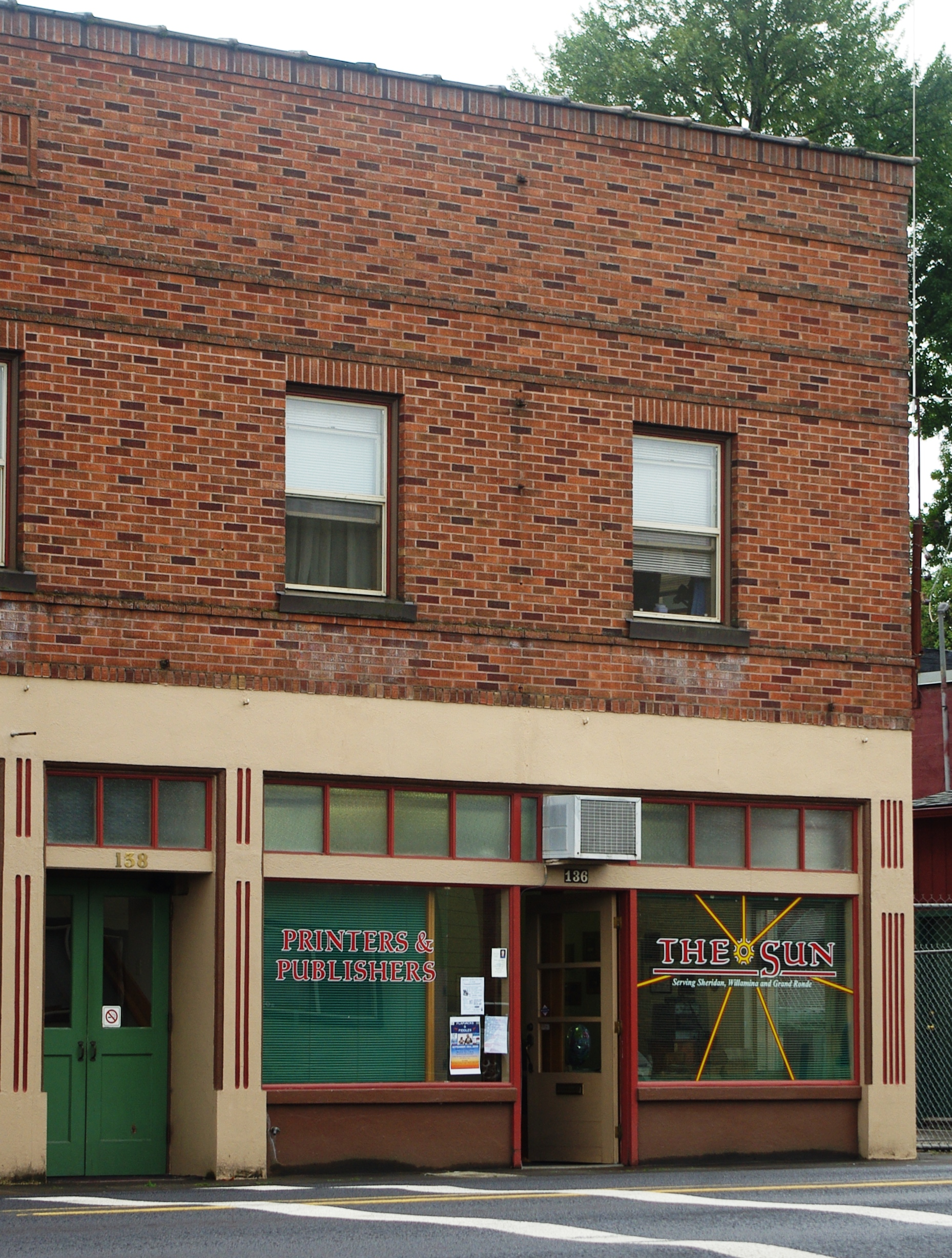
- Former offices of the Sheridan Sun at 136 E. Main Street
- Type: Weekly newspaper
- Founded: 1890
- Language: English
- Ceased publication: 2014
- Headquarters: Sheridan, Oregon, United States
- OCLC number: 42972899

The Sun was the newspaper for Sheridan, Oregon, United States. The paper was published weekly on Wednesdays. The Sun served the West Yamhill Valley communities of Sheridan, Willamina, and Grand Ronde in Yamhill and Polk counties.

== History ==
The early history of the Sheridan Sun is uncertain; while most sources date the newspaper's founding to 1890, some early records suggest that the Sun was founded around 1881-82. By 1892, the newspaper was published weekly by H. G. Guild, who was known as a "versatile and witty editor." He retired in 1897 and sold the Sheridan Sun to Chris Yates and B. F. McLaughlin. In August, 1898, McLaughlin's wife Ida Finley McLaughlin fell out of a rowboat and drowned in Nestucca Bay. The couple had been married for only four months. In 1900, Yates sold the paper to F. H Barnhart, who died about two months later from a lung hemorrhage. By 1907, the paper was managed by B. F. Young.

In 1908, Oscar D. Hamstreet purchased the Sun after moving from Sheridan, Wyoming, where he had been editor of the Sheridan Enterprise. In 1913, a fire destroyed most of downtown Sheridan, including the offices and equipment of the Sun; Hamstreet managed to save his list of subscribers and he traveled approximately 50 miles to Portland to temporarily print the newspaper. He returned to Sheridan with copies of the Sun on horseback and delivered them to readers without missing a week. In 1929, Hamstreet sold the paper to Steen M. Johnson. In 1937, the Sun was purchased by Paul Launer and Miss Adelaide V. Lake, a former reporter at The Oregonian. In late 1938, the Sun was sold to C. F. Brown, former owner of Twin City News. Perry W. Willoughby became the next owner, sometime during the early 1940s. In 1945, Willoughby sold the newspaper to Dean Holmes, who published the Sun for the next 17 years.

Holmes owned the Sun until 1963, when it was purchased by Ted M. Brammer, publisher of the Nyssa Gate City Journal, and William L. Bladine, publisher of the McMinnville News-Register. The Bladine family later became sole owner of the newspaper and in 1969, Phil Bladine sold the Sun to Douglas K. Parker. Eagle Newspapers acquired the paper from Parker in 1978 and sold it in 1981. The new owner was George Robertson. At the time, the Sun had a circulation of 2,500 readers. In April 2008, the Sun was purchased by Clinton Vining, the newspaper's last owner; the final edition of the Sheridan Sun was published on June 25, 2014. At that time, the newspaper had around 700 subscribers and a total circulation of about 1,000 readers.
