= Beaverton Valley Times =

Weekly newspaper published in Beaverton, Oregon

- Type: Weekly newspaper
- Format: Broadsheet
- Owners: Carpenter Media Group (since 2024); Pamplin Media Group (2000–2024)
- Publisher: Nikki DeBuse
- Editor: Lauren Bishop
- Founded: 1921
- Headquarters: 6605 S.E. Lake Road; Portland, OR 97222-2161; United States
- City: Beaverton, Oregon, U.S.
- Circulation: 8,597 (as of 2022)
- Sister newspapers: Forest Grove News-Times
- OCLC number: 36326468
- Website: beavertonvalleytimes.com

The Beaverton Valley Times, also known as the Valley Times, is a weekly newspaper covering the city of Beaverton, Oregon, United States, and adjacent unincorporated areas in the northern part of the Tualatin Valley. Owned since 2024 by the Carpenter Media Group, the paper was established in 1921. Currently based in neighboring Portland, the Valley Times is printed each Thursday.

== History ==
What is today the Beaverton Valley Times was established in 1951 as The Valley News, with the consolidation of four local newspapers, the Aloha News, Beaverton Enterprise, Multnomah Press, and Tigard Sentinel. However, the paper's owners have long used 1921 as the date of foundation, based on that being the year in which the owner of the four papers, H. H. Jeffries, acquired the Multnomah Press. Jeffries launched the Sentinel in 1924 and the Aloha News and Beaverton Enterprise in 1927. He later sold the group of four papers to Stan Netherton. Meanwhile, another newspaper being published separately in the area was the Beaverton Review, which was launched in 1922, but ceased publication in 1941.

The four jointly owned newspapers were consolidated into a single paper, The Valley News, after Netherton sold them to Ivan Smith and H.D. and Dan Powell, in early 1951. Not long afterward, in late 1951, the Valley News was sold to Hugh McGilvra and Elbert Hawkins, with George Hoyt joining them later as co-owner. In 1951, the paper had fewer than 2,000 paid subscribers and averaged 12–16 pages per issue.

On September 6, 1962, The Valley News was renamed The Valley Times (OCLC number 30759134). By that time, the Tigard Times, which had begun publication in February 1957 (as a weekly, subscription paper), and the Washington County News-Times of Forest Grove were affiliated or jointly owned, and the renaming of the Valley News as the Times was intended to publicize that relationship. The publishing company's name at that time was Valley Publishing, Inc. Circulation surpassed 10,000 in 1967.

Publisher Hugh Edward McGilvra sold the newspaper in 1981 to the owners of Eugene's Register-Guard. In January 1989, "Beaverton" was added to the paper's name, making it The Beaverton Valley Times. In 1989, the paper's circulation was in excess of 8,000.

The paper won a first-place prize for its size category in 1992 for general excellence from the Oregon Newspaper Publishers Association. In 1996, along with five other area newspapers, the Valley Times was sold to Steve and Randalyn Clark. In 1997, the paper took first place in its division at the annual Better Newspaper Contest of the Oregon Newspaper Publishers Association. In July 2000, the Valley Times was honored by the same organization for excellence. Community Newspapers Inc. sold the newspaper along with several others in the Portland metropolitan area to Pamplin Media Group in August 2000.

By 2003, the paper began printing announcements for same-sex couples' commitment ceremonies. In 2005, it was the largest weekly newspaper in Oregon. The Oregonian announced plans to launch a competing paper, the Beaverton Leader, in March 2013. The Leader ceased publication in 2016.

Effective with the edition of February 8, 2018, the print edition of the Beaverton Valley Times was combined with those of two other Pamplin papers, the weekly The Times (also known as the Tigard Times, and covering both Tigard and Tualatin) and the monthly Sherwood Gazette, published on Thursdays and named simply The Times. The paper now covers Beaverton, Tigard, Tualatin, and Sherwood. The three papers had already been sharing some content. The new title is used for print copies delivered to subscribers, while newspaper racks/boxes carry a slightly different, zoned edition of The Times, named The Washington County Times, that was introduced when the papers were merged. In 2021, Pamplin revived the use of the Beaverton Valley Times and the Sherwood Gazette titles in some print editions, but in July 2024, the Sherwood Gazette was again merged into The Times, its print edition discontinued.

== Unrelated predecessor ==
In 1914, the Beaverton Owl changed its name to the Times. It continued under that title until at least 1922.
