= Portland Tribune =

Weekly newspaper published in Portland, Oregon

- First issue, 2001
- Type: Online newspaper (also a print newspaper from 2001 to 2025)
- Format: Broadsheet
- Owner: Carpenter Media Group (since 2024)
- Publisher: Vance Tong
- Editor: none
- Staff writers: several
- Founded: 2001
- Headquarters: 6605 SE Lake Road; Portland, Oregon United States
- OCLC number: 46708462
- Website: portlandtribune.com

The Portland Tribune is an online newspaper and former printed newspaper in Portland, Oregon, United States. It is part of the Carpenter Media Group, which acquired a number of community newspapers in the Portland metropolitan area from Pamplin Media Group in 2024. Launched in 2001, the paper was published twice weekly until 2008, when it was reduced to weekly. It returned to twice-weekly publication in 2014 and was again reduced to weekly publication in 2020. It was distributed free from its 2001 launch until October 2022, then becoming available only by paid subscription or purchase at retail outlets. The Tribune ceased print and went online-only in June 2025.

== History ==
Portland businessman Robert B. Pamplin Jr. announced his intention to found the paper in the summer of 2000. The first issue of the twice-weekly (Tuesdays and Fridays) paper was published February 9, 2001, joining The Oregonian, the city's only daily general-interest newspaper, and the alternative weeklies Willamette Week and The Portland Mercury. At the time, it was a rare example of the expansion of print news, in a time when many cities were seeing newspapers merge or go out of business. But its launch preceded a significant national downturn in advertising sales, which posed difficulties for a startup newspaper. Eleven months after its launch, the Tribune cut back on home deliveries. The newspaper was reportedly losing money faster than anticipated after its first year. By late 2006, its newsroom staff had been reduced to 27.

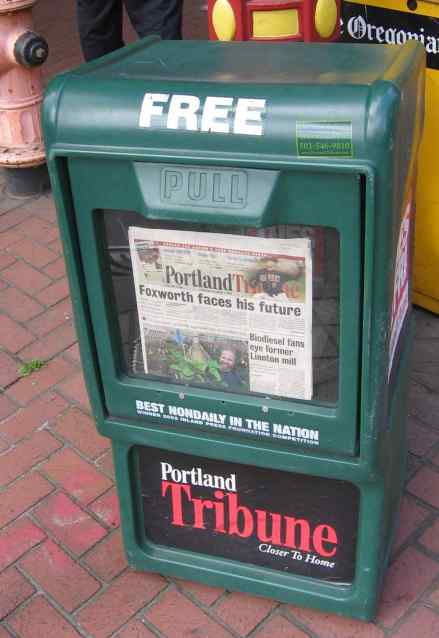
Tribune newspaper box, in use 2001–2023

On May 5, 2008, the paper announced it would switch, effective immediately, to a once-a-week print format, with a Thursday print edition (in place of Tuesday and Fridays) accompanied by daily updates to its website. In July 2009, "difficult economic conditions" led to the layoff of two reporters and the resignation of its managing editor, resulting in a newsroom staff of 14.

In March 2014, the Portland Tribune resumed twice-weekly publication of its print edition, with reinstatement of a Tuesday edition, while continuing to publish a Thursday edition. That same year Pamplin launched the Business Tribune, a business newspaper published as an insert section in the Portland Tribune.

In January 2020, the Portland Tribune returned to once-weekly on Thursdays and online articles became limited to paid subscribers only. Publication of the print edition shifted from Thursday to Wednesdays in April 2020. In October 2022, publisher Mark Garber announced that the weekly newsprint edition, which had continued to be free, would change at the beginning of November to a paid product, available only to subscribers and by purchase at retail outlets.

In June 2024, Pamplin Media Group, the paper's owner, was sold to Carpenter Media Group. In June 2025, at least six Tribune newsroom workers were laid off, including its managing editor. The layoffs left the paper with two reporters and no editor. Later that month, Carpenter announced the Tribune will cease print and publish online only.

== Coverage ==
The paper deals almost exclusively with issues local to Portland and the U.S. state of Oregon. The paper is known for its extensive coverage of local high school, college and professional sports teams, with concentration on the NBA, Pac-10, Big Sky Conference and West Coast Conference. A business section was added to the print edition in 2014, along with other coverage expansion, including health and fitness content and more regional coverage.

The Tribune sponsors the annual Portland Regional Spelling Bee for middle school students. The champion participates in the Scripps National Spelling Bee in Washington, D.C.

== See also ==
- Hillsboro Tribune
