= Robert B. Pamplin Jr. =

American businessman

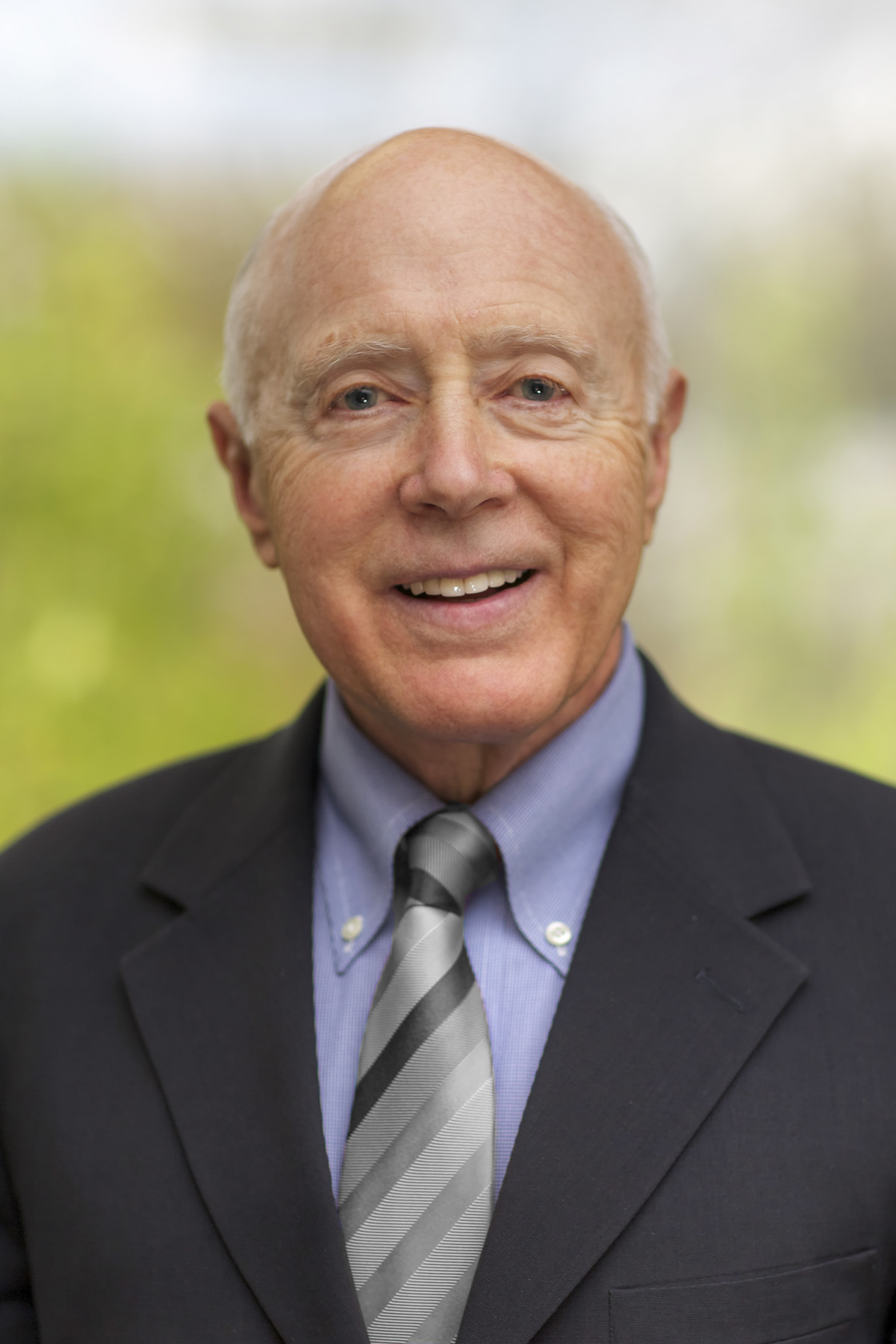
- Born: Robert Boisseau Pamplin Jr. September 3, 1941 (age 85); Augusta, Georgia
- Occupations: Businessman, philanthropist, minister, educator, historical preservationist, author
- Father: Robert B. Pamplin

Robert Boisseau Pamplin Jr. (born September 3, 1941) is an American businessman, philanthropist, and minister. He is also noted as an educator, historic preservationist and author.

A longtime Oregonian, Pamplin is chairman, president and CEO of R.B. Pamplin Corporation, a family-owned company headquartered in Portland. It is one of the largest private corporations in Oregon. He has appeared on the Forbes 400 list of wealthiest Americans. In 2001, he was reported to be the third-wealthiest person in Oregon.

Pamplin's holdings include textile company Mount Vernon Mills, and the Pamplin Media Group.

== Personal life and education ==
Pamplin was born in Augusta, Georgia to Robert B. and Katherine Reese Pamplin.

In 1953, Pamplin moved with his family to Oregon. As a 10-year-old recovering from a year-long bout with hepatitis that made him bedridden, Pamplin began training in the Charles Atlas weightlifting method to regain his strength. In high school, he became an AAU Olympic Lifts weightlifting champion which led to a lifelong commitment to fitness.

After graduating from Lincoln High School in Portland, Pamplin studied at Virginia Polytechnic Institute and State University, ultimately transferring to Lewis and Clark College in 1962 to complete his undergraduate training. Pamplin has received eight degrees, including two doctorates:

- Bachelor of Science degrees in Business Administration (1964), Accounting (1965) and Economics (1966) from Lewis and Clark College
- Master's degrees in Business Administration (1968) and education from the University of Portland (1975)
- Doctor of Philosophy in Business Administration from the then-unaccredited, distance education California Coast University (1976)
- Masters of Arts in theology (1978) and a Doctor of Ministry in Theology (1982) from Western Seminary

In 1965, while in college, Pamplin became a licensed stockbroker and transformed a modest inheritance into his first million dollars through careful investing.

Pamplin and his wife Marilyn live in Lake Oswego, a suburb of Portland.

== Business ==
In 1976, at age 35, Pamplin started his own business and managed the R.B. Pamplin Corporation. As chairman, President and CEO of the R.B. Pamplin Corporation, Pamplin oversees several subsidiaries across three industries, including textile manufacturing, construction and media.

Holdings include:

- Mount Vernon Mills, one of the country's largest privately owned manufacturers of textile and chemical products for the apparel, industrial, institutional, and commercial markets based in Greenville, South Carolina.
- Pamplin Media Group, publisher and producer of the Portland Tribune and 24 community newspapers in the Portland media market
- Anne Amie Vineyards, a vineyard and winery in Carlton, Oregon. Pamplin founded the winery after purchasing Chateau Benoit Winery in 1999.
- Columbia Empire Farm, producing berries and hazelnuts products since 1976

Pamplin's ownership of both media and major business interests in the Portland area has had some controversy, as his media holdings have been said to be engaged in a "newspaper war" over local circulation with The Oregonian and its affiliated papers. When the Tribune was launched in 2001, and again as of fall 2012, his planned donation to the city of Portland of part of Ross Island, where his concrete and asphalt company was located, became controversial when industrial contamination was discovered on parts of the island.

In February 2022, Willamette Week detailed alleged mismanagement of Pamplin's employee pension fund. By the end of the 2023, the company's pension fund held 52% of its assets in real estate, which is five times the maximum the U.S. Department of Labor allows.

On Dec. 13, 2023, Pacific Fence and Wire Company filed a lawsuit alleging that Ross Island Sand & Gravel and Robert Pamplin Jr. failed to pay a $153,000 bill.

== Educator ==
After receiving his master's degrees, Pamplin began teaching as a lecturer at Lewis & Clark College and went on to become a tenured business professor at the University of Portland.

Pamplin has also served on several state and presidential appointed commissions, and college boards of directors. He is a past trustee of five college boards, and past chairman of three, including Lewis & Clark College, Western Seminary and the University of Portland. He served on President Gerald Ford's National Advisory Council on Vocational Education from 1975 to 1980. He was appointed by two governors to the Oregon State Scholarship Commission, serving from 1974 to 1980.

Pamplin is an active donor to numerous colleges, universities and scholarship programs. The business school at University of Portland is named for him and the college of business at Virginia Tech for him and his father. Scholarship programs created by Pamplin include The Pamplin Scholars Program at Virginia Tech and The Pamplin Society of Fellows at Lewis & Clark College.

== Preservation and philanthropy ==
Pamplin established Pamplin Historical Park in 1993. The park contains the NRHP-listed Petersburg Breakthrough Battlefield; and the National Museum of the Civil War Soldier (established 1999), and has preserved critical aspects of the Civil War.

In 2007, Pamplin donated 45 acres (18 ha) of the 400-acre (160 ha) Ross Island to the city of Portland, which plans to manage the property as a natural area. The island contains considerable natural habitat, but also contains industrial waste and toxic fill dirt and is listed for cleanup by the Oregon Department of Environmental Quality. The portions donated to the city, however, are thought to be pristine and contain habitat for a wide variety of wildlife, including bald eagles.

The Dr. and Mrs. Robert B. Pamplin Jr. International Collection of Art and History encompasses 5,000 years of antiquities and art.

Pamplin was one of the backers of the effort to preserve Shaniko, Oregon, a former central Oregon sheep's wool transportation terminus of the Columbia River Southern Railway Company (1900 c. 1911) boomtown that is now considered a ghost town.

Through personal and corporate giving, Pamplin has donated more than $150 million to numerous charities and has been instrumental in raising $500 million more for various causes. Pamplin also ran a food ministry for many years through Christ Community Church, where he was founder and senior pastor. The program fed between 500 - 1,000 daily in Portland.

== Recognition ==
In recognition of his business leadership, he has received the Woodrow Wilson Center Corporate Citizenship Award, the national Herman W. Lay Award for entrepreneurship, and the Businessman of the Year Award from Beta Gamma Sigma International.

Pamplin has been awarded many honorary degrees and national awards, including the Freedom Leadership Medal from the Freedoms Foundation at Valley Forge, the National Caring Award from the Caring Institute, Philanthropist of the Year by the National Association of Fundraising Executives and national Volunteer of the Year from Volunteers of America.

In Oregon, he has been honored with the Governor's Gold Award, the Oregon Entrepreneur of the Year award from the Oregon Entrepreneur Forum, the Governor's Arts Award, and Portland's First Citizen.

== Admission of Pension Wrongdoing ==
In an apparent effort to arrest the decline of his financial fortunes, Pamplin, in violation of federal pension law, sold his private holdings to his company's employee pension plan. On December 26, 2024, in response to an investigation by the Willamette Week and later by the U.S. Department of Labor, he admitted that he sold overvalued company real estate to the pension fund. According to one pension law expert, Terry Deneen, he engaged in “systematic looting of the pension plan.” In response to the resultant federal consent decree, he agreed to provide restitution, including foregone investment returns, to the fund.

== Works authored ==
Pamplin is the author of 36 books and comic books, including two book-of-the-month club selections, including:

- Worcester, Thomas K.; Pamplin, Robert B. Jr. (1973). A portrait of Oregon. Beaverton, Or.: OMSI Press; distributed by the Touchstone Press. ISBN 0911518223.
- Three in One. Touchstone Press. 1974.
- Worcester, Thomas K.; Pamplin, Robert B. Jr. (1976). A portrait of Colorado. Portland: OMSI Press, Oregon Museum of Science and Industry. ISBN 9780911518436.
- The Storybook Primer on Managing: According to the Wedding Cake Concept. The Touchstone Press. 1977.
- Pamplin Jr., Robert B. (1985). Everything is just great : a story of faith, adventure, and success. Portland, OR: Multnomah Press. ISBN 0880701188.
- The Gift. Christ Community Church. 1986.
- "Another Virginian: A Study of the Life and Beliefs of Robert Boisseau Pamplin". R.B. Pamplin Corporation. 1986.
- One Who Believed: Volume I. Christ Community Church. 1988.
- One Who Believed: Volume II. Christ Community Church. 1991.
- Climbing the Centuries. R. B. Pamplin Corporation. 1994. ISBN 1135654247.
- Pamplin, Robert B. Jr. (1993). Heritage: The Making of an American Family, Master Media Limited. New York: Mastermedia. ISBN 0942361962.
- Pamplin, Robert B. Jr. (1995). Prelude to Surrender: The Pamplin family and the siege of Petersburg. New York: Mastermedia Ltd. ISBN 1571010491.
- Pamplin, Robert B. (1995). American heroes : their lives, their values, their beliefs. New York: Mastermedia. ISBN 1571010106.
- Reese, Robert (pen name) (1998). Alaskan gold. New York: Berkley Books. ISBN 042516263X.
