= Carpenter Media Group =

- Type: Private
- Industry: Media
- Genre: Publishing
- Headquarters: Tuscaloosa, Alabama, U.S.
- Key people: Todd Carpenter (chairman)

Carpenter Media Group (CMG) is an American media conglomerate based in Tuscaloosa, Alabama. The company operates more than 250 outlets around the United States and Canada and is the fourth-largest American newspaper company.

== History ==
CMG was founded in 2023 after separating from Boone Newsmedia, an American newspaper company with publications across the American South. The company took ownership of ten of Boone's newspapers.

Over the next two years, CMG embarked on an acquisition spree, focusing on acquiring struggling companies that operated multiple publications. In March 2024, the company purchased Black Press Media, which owned over 150 newspapers across Washington, western Canada, and Hawaii, including the Honolulu Star-Advertiser, Hawaii's largest daily newspaper. Three months later, in June 2024, CMG purchased Pamplin Media Group, which published over two dozen papers across Oregon, including the Portland Tribune. In October 2024, Carpenter acquired EO Media Group. In its State of Local News Report from that year, the Local News Initiative at Northwestern University noted that within a year, CMG had become the fourth-largest American newspaper company, owning 138 publications in 2024 after just 54 in 2023.

Carpenter has faced criticism for laying off staff after acquiring newspapers.
