= Journalism in Oregon =

Journalism in the U.S. state of Oregon had its origins from the American settlers of the Oregon Country in the 1840s. This was decades after explorers like Robert Gray and Lewis and Clark first arrived in the region, several months before the first newspaper was issued in neighboring California, and several years before the United States formally asserted control of the region by establishing the Oregon Territory.

According to historian Johan B. Horner, early pioneers craved newspapers from the east coast, which delivered news of loved ones back home as well as national news, but which arrived as infrequently as twice a year. Horner stated that in the absence of printed material, the community-based art of song drove early Oregon knowledge sharing and patriotism, and drove an intense interest in local newspapers when they did begin to emerge.

== Newspapers ==
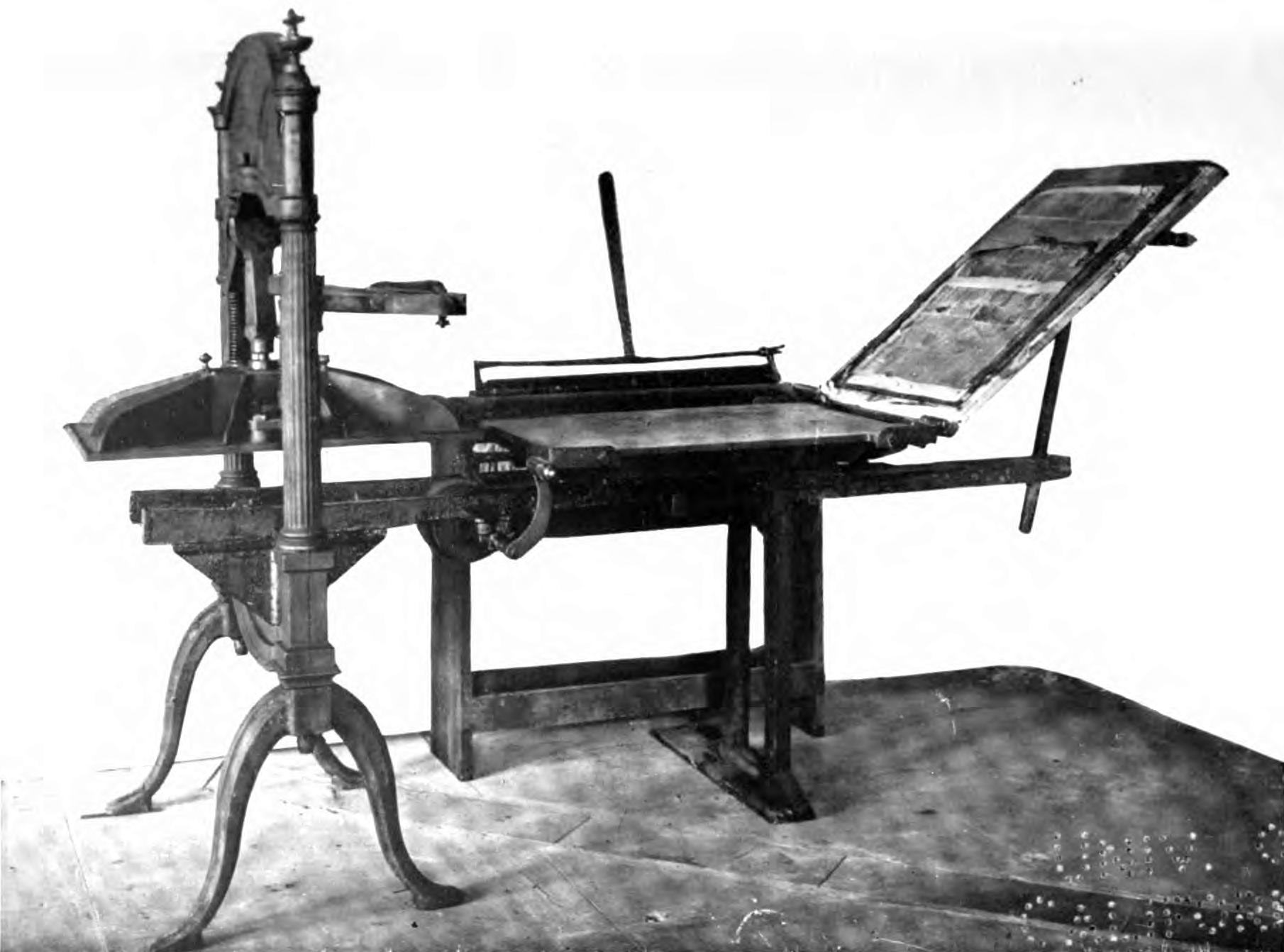
Oregon's first newspaper, the Spectator, made use of the first newspaper printing press in the western United States.

George Stanley Turnbull, professor of journalism at the University of Oregon School of Journalism and Communication, published his History of Oregon Newspapers in 1939. The book was described as the most authoritative overview of the field as recently as 1993.

The first printing press in the region, a small Ramage press gifted by a native church in the Sandwich Islands, came to the Waiilatpu mission in Walla Walla in 1839. That press was never used to print newspapers; but in 1844, a group formed in Oregon City with the purpose of establishing a newspaper. The Oregon Printing Association formally declared that the press they acquired was never to be used as a vehicle for partisan politics. (Historian Frances Fuller Victor speculated that the non-partisan rule reflected misgivings about missionary influence among early American Oregon pioneers.) The group secured a press from New York, and produced the first newspaper in the western United States, the Oregon Spectator, in 1846. After going through three editors in the first few months, the Spectator hired George Law Curry as editor. Curry remained in the post until 1848, when he resigned due to a dispute with the Association over his wish to adopt a "firm and consistent American tone." The Oregon Territory was formally established in August 1848, with Oregon City—the home of the Spectator—serving as its seat of government for the first three years. The Spectator continued, with changes in ownership, focus, and political focus (becoming a Whig mouthpiece in its later years) until 1855.

In 1845, the U.S. Postal Service made the first effort to establish mail communication with Oregon.

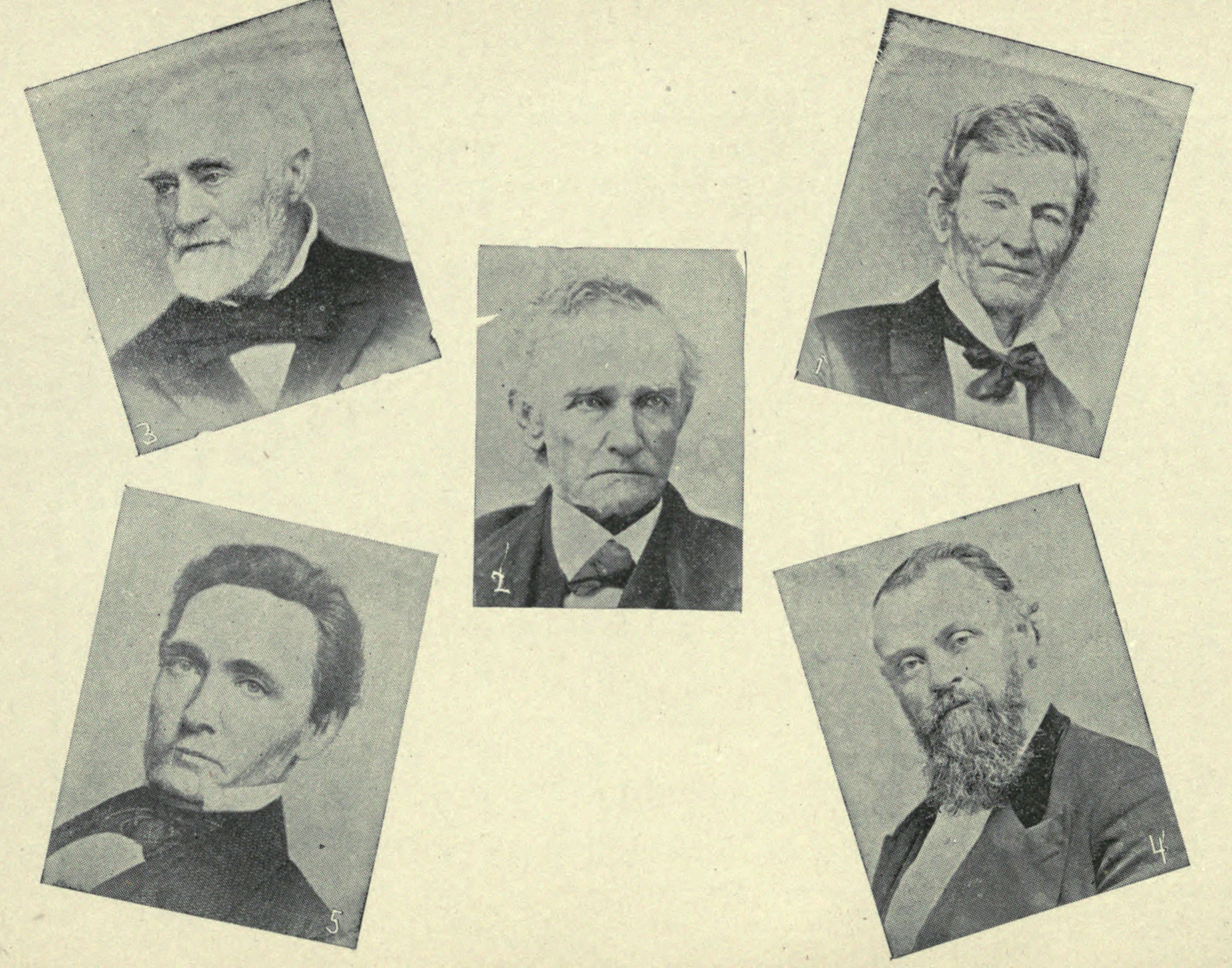
PIONEER JOURNALISTS OF OREGON.: 1. Col. W. G. T'Vault, 1843, first editor of the "Spectator," issued at Oregon City, February 5, 1846, the first paper west of the Missouri River.; 2. Thomas J. Dryer, 1850, founder of the "Oregonian," first issue December 6, 1850, on the corner of Front and Morrison streets.; 3. Asahel Bush, 1851, founder of the "Statesman," Salem, first issue March 21, 1851.; 4. Thornton T. McElroy, 1851, printer on the "Spectator," Oregon City, and founder of the "Columbian," first newspaper north of the Columbia River, issued at Olympia, September 1, 1852.; 5. Delazon Smith, 1852, founder of the "Democrat," Albany, 1853: one of the first United States senators from Oregon.

Other early Oregon papers included the short-lived Free Press, founded by Curry upon his departure from the Spectator, with type purchased from Catholic missionaries and an improvised press; the Western Star, later renamed the Oregon Weekly Times, founded in Milwaukie in 1850 and moving to Portland in 1851. The Weekly Oregonian was the fifth paper in Oregon, and the oldest one still extant. It launched in Portland on December 4, 1850. Its press was purchased in 1852 and used to found the Columbian, the first paper north of the Columbia River. The Statesman was founded in Salem in 1851, in response to the Whig-oriented Oregonian.

In the 1850s and '60s, journalism in Oregon was characterized by bitter attacks among newspaper publishers and editors on their editorial pages. The primary participants in this dynamic, known as the "Oregon Style" of journalism, were Democrat Asahel Bush of the Salem Statesman, Whig/Republican Thomas Jefferson Dryer of the Portland Oregonian, and Whig William Lysander Adams of the Oregon Argus. By the 1870s a libel law passed in the state, as well as a state press association with a code of ethics, reduced the acrimony of these exchanges.

The first daily paper was Portland's Daily News, begun by S. A. English and W. B. Taylor, April 18, 1859. The "first real Republican paper" on the west coast was the Oregon City Argus, founded in 1855 and merged into the Statesman in 1863. A number of pro-Southern newspapers in Oregon were suppressed by the federal government in 1862. In the 1860s, telegraph service came to Oregon, initially connecting Portland and other Willamette Valley cities to northern California.

Even as late as 1872, according to Oregon news historian George S. Turnbull, there was a shortage of local news published in what he terms the "pioneer papers," as compared with his present day (1939). Turnbull identified three reasons: the relative scarcity of important happenings as compared with today; the fact that the demand was still much heavier for the news from "outside" than for the home news; the earlier reporters had not yet built up the technique of effective reporting. Around the turn of the century, the average lifespan of a newspaper was less than a decade.

In the teens, Oregon (along with Washington) banned liquor advertising, prompting at least some out-of-state newspapers to cancel subscriptions in the state. During the Great Depression, when the cost of newsprint was high, the number of newspapers in the state dropped from 278 (1930) to 125 (1940).

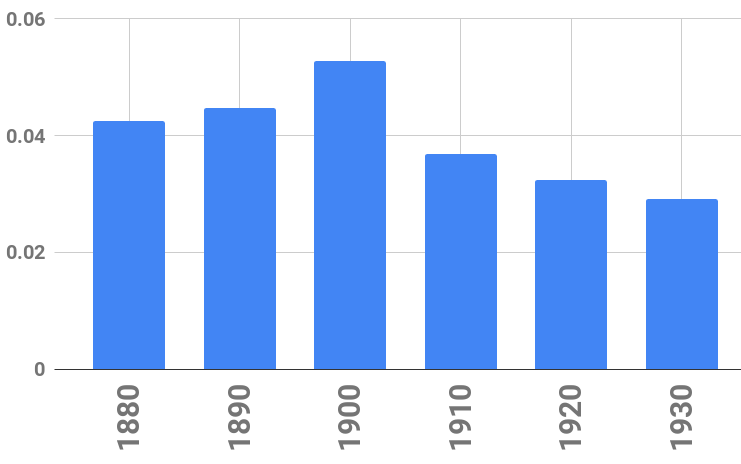
The number of newspapers in Oregon as a percentage of the population spiked around 1900. Turnbull, who compiled the data, attributed this to "a decade of opening up the country, establishing towns and cities, a decade of land and timber notices," and observed that, from 1900 up to the date of his writing (1939), a shrinking number of newspapers provided greater circulation numbers overall.

The Oregon Journal was established in 1902, and rivaled the Oregonian in statewide coverage throughout much of its existence. It took positions on a number of policy issues, and was generally considered a Democratic newspaper. The Journal acquired radio stations in the 1930s and '40s, and in 1947 it became the first paper in the country to purchase its own news helicopter. The Journal's circulation peaked the next year.

The Oregonian vacated the Oregonian Building, its home of more than 50 years, in 1948, but put itself in financial distress in the construction of its new building; this resulted in the sale of the newspaper to S. I. Newhouse in 1950. Newhouse subsequently bought the Oregon Journal in 1961. The Journal continued as a separate publication (though its Sunday edition ceased) until 1982, when Newhouse merged it with the Oregonian. During a strike which lasted from 1959 to 1964, the Portland Reporter emerged as an alternative to the Oregonian and the Journal. It ceased publication upon the conclusion of the strike.

Regional chain newspapers

Several locally owned companies operate groups of newspapers in Oregon. These include:

- Pamplin Media Group, which launched its flagship Portland Tribune in 2001, after buying a number of newspapers in the Portland metropolitan area, and about a decade later adding newspapers in Central Oregon and the Willamette Valley acquired from Eagle Newspapers in 2013.
- EO Media Group, owner of the East Oregonian, the Astorian, The Bulletin and several weekly newspapers on the Oregon Coast, eastern Oregon and one in southwest Washington, as well as the Capital Press, geared to the statewide agricultural industry.
- Willamette Week of Portland, which also owns weekly newspapers in New Mexico and North Carolina.
- Country Media operates 10 newspapers in Oregon including The World in Coos Bay and Lincoln County Leader in Newport.

Newspapers owned by national chains

- The Oregonian and Portland Business Journal - Portland (Advance Publications)
- Salem Statesman-Journal and Eugene Register-Guard (Gannett)
- Corvallis Gazette-Times and Albany Democrat-Herald (Lee Enterprises)
- Klamath Falls Herald and News and Lake County Examiner (Adams Publishing Group)
- Ontario Argus Observer (Wick Communications)

=== Significant events ===
- Pulitzer: Medford Mail Tribune (1934) local corruption; Llewellyn Banks and the Good Government Congress
- Pulitzer: The Oregonian (1957) Teamsters (see Jim Elkins, Dave Beck, McClellan Committee)
- In the 1992 United States Senate election in Oregon, the Oregonian was faulted for missing a crucial story, which was then broken by on the east coast by the Washington Post. This resulted in bumper stickers that read, "If it matters to Oregonians, it's in the Washington Post," a twist on the Oregonian's slogan "If it matters to Oregonians, it's in The Oregonian.
- Pulitzer: The Oregonian (2001) INS (among five Pulitzers under Rowe
- Pulitzer: Willamette Week (2005) Goldschmidt

=== Specialized press ===
- German language newspapers of Oregon (1867 through the early 1900s)
- Toveritar and Toveri, national Finnish newspapers published by the Western Workmen's Co-operative Publishing Company in Astoria in the early 20th century
- The New Northwest

Black newspapers:

- Portland New Age
- The Advocate (1912-?)
- The Skanner
- The Portland Observer

Gay newspapers:

- In the early 1980s, several gay-oriented magazines were launched in Portland, including the Cascade Voice, the Eagle Newsmagazine, and Just Out.

Business:

- Portland Business Journal
- Daily Journal of Commerce

Others

- Street Roots (1998-), a street newspaper
- Portland Alliance (1981-)
- The Asian Reporter (1991-)
- El Hispanic News

== Magazines ==
L. Samuel launched The West Shore, a monthly magazine, in 1875. It was the state's first illustrated periodical, featuring wood cuts and zinc etchings. Samuel described it as being "devoted to Literature, Science, Art, and the Resources of the Pacific Northwest." He promoted the magazine all over the United States and in Europe, and claimed the largest circulation of any Oregon publication. The magazine peaked in 1889, weekly, when it began publishing weekly, with color and tint-block illustrations. Samuel was known for turning down advertising deemed problematic, prior to the emergence of more formal journalism ethics and standards.

- Lucy A. Mallory
- The Pacific Monthly / Sunset (magazine)

== Radio and television ==
Public broadcasting began in 1923, out of the Oregon State University. The name Oregon Public Broadcasting was first adopted in 1971. Until 1981, it was part of the Oregon higher education system.

List of Oregon radio stations

List of television stations in Oregon

== Professionalization, ethics, politics, and policy ==
Nationwide movement to codify news ethics in early 20th century: wikisource:en:History of American Journalism/Chapter 19

After the Oregon Printing Association (discussed in the newspapers section), the next significant meeting of Oregon newspaper editors and publishers was in October 1878. Following an episode in which editorial attacks between newspapers resulted in one Portland newspaper editor being fatally shot by another, a number of editors organized with the purpose of promoting an effective libel law. They achieved that goal, but with some ambivalence from the Portland Bee, whose assistant editor had been sentenced to 15 years for the slaying. The group is not known to have reconvened.

The Washington State Press Association hosted an annual conference beginning in the mid-1880s, which attracted Oregon journalists.

The Oregon Press Association, now known as the Oregon Newspaper Publishers Association (ONPA), was founded in 1887. Eighteen journalists, primarily from the Willamette Valley, convened at Lincoln City at the urging of editors and publishers of the Roseburg Review, the Yaquina Post, and the Benton Leader; 18 more, including journalists from Eastern Oregon, enrolled by letter. Until 1971, the organization's offices were at the University of Oregon School of Journalism and Communication (SOJC); after that, the offices were moved to Portland and then to Lake Oswego, where they remain as of 2018.

In 1906 the press association held a conference in conjunction with the Oregon Development League.

ONPA's Hall of Fame

The Fourth estate;

In 1917, the University of Oregon's journalism school established Oregon Exchanges, a monthly periodical "for the newspapermen of the State of Oregon." It was succeeded in 1932 by Oregon Publisher.

The Annual Oregon Newspaper Conference is said to have been first held in 1916, though another reference suggests it was established as much as a decade prior. At the fourth such conference, in 1922, participants adopted Oregon Code of Ethics for Newspapers, considered the problem of paper cost, proposed a wireless news service, and held concurrent meetings of members of the Associated Press and United Press International. A syndicate, headed by George Putnam, was established to address the problem of newsprint price. The conference was covered in Editor and Publisher in 1925. The ONPA revised and republished the Code of Ethics in 1951.

In 1949 a Houghton-Mifflin textbook, Newsmen at Work, related stories of several reporters who originally hailed from Oregon, including Eric W. Allen (first dean of the University of Oregon School of Journalism), Palmer Hoyt (publisher of the Denver Post), and Charles E. Gratke (of the Christian Science Monitor). Laurence R. Campbell of the University of Oregon was a co-author of the book.

Tom McCall

- Oregon Shield Law

The ONPA sponsored "The Print Market," believed to be the first trade show in the United States to focus on advertising sales, in 1976.

The Payne Award for Ethics in Journalism was established at the SOJC in 1999.

During the George Floyd protests in summer 2020, independent journalists covered the events on a nightly basis, in contrast with local media (which sent reporters to some, but not all, of the events) and national media (which generally did not cover the story until federal agents arrived in Portland, about 45 days into the protests).

== Education ==
- University of Oregon School of Journalism and Communication
- Student media e.g. Oregon Daily Emerald

=== General commentary on news media in Oregon ===
A 2018 Columbia Journalism Review report noted the decline in dedicated statehouse reporters since the mid-2000s, and cited interviews with current and past members of the press corps as giving overall coverage of state politics a low rating. The report noted various new models for gathering state government news, such as a partnership in which the Pamplin Media Group and the East Oregonian news group share two statehouse reporters.

- Oregon reporters missed the story of a failing health exchange—until they didn't: After a slow start, the state press corps recovers with a bang Trudy Lieberman, CJR May 5, 2014
