= Robert W. Chandler =

American journalist and businessman

- Born: May 12, 1921; Marysville, California, USA
- Died: July 12, 1996 (aged 75); Bend, Oregon, USA
- Occupations: Journalist and publisher
- Awards: Oregon Newspaper Hall of Fame

Robert W. Chandler (May 12, 1921 – July 12, 1996) was an American journalist, businessman, and philanthropist. He was the editor and publisher of The Bulletin, a daily newspaper in Bend, Oregon. He ran the newspaper for 43 years. With the Bulletin as a starting point, he founded Western Communications, Inc., a company that owns and publishes newspapers in Oregon and California. Among his various efforts in the field, he served as president of the national Society of Professional Journalists. He was also a major donor to the High Desert Museum in Bend. He was inducted into the Oregon Newspaper Hall of Fame in 2006.

== Early life ==
Chandler was born on May 12, 1921, in Marysville, California. He grew up on the family's farm near Yuba City, California. He attended Stanford University, earning a degree in journalism. During World War II, Chandler was a special agent in the United States Army's Counter Intelligence Corps. While in the Army, he served in Australia, New Guinea, the Philippines, Korea, and Japan.

After leaving the Army, Chandler worked for a weekly newspaper that served the Burney and Fall River Mills area in northern California. Later, he took a job on the staff of the San Francisco Chronicle. He also worked as a reporter and bureau manager for United Press International in a series of assignments in San Francisco, Los Angeles, Phoenix, Boise, Helena, and Portland, Oregon. Chandler also worked for The Denver Post for a time.

== Bend Bulletin ==
Robert W. Sawyer owned and published The Bend Bulletin from 1919 to 1953. In 1953, he put the newspaper up for sale. Sawyer received offers from several large newspaper chains, but eventually sold the newspaper to Chandler. To make the purchase affordable, Sawyer only required a $6,000 down payment.

Chandler ran the newspaper for the next 43 years, first as The Bend Bulletin and after 1963 as The Bulletin. During his tenure, Chandler brought new technology into his newspaper operation. Soon after he bought the paper in 1953, he expanded the photoengraving facilities. In 1956, he replaced the paper's flatbed press with a new rotary press that printed 13,000 32-page sections per hour. The new press also allowed the paper to print photographs in color.

In 1966, Chandler moved The Bulletin to a new building on Hill Street in the southern part of Bend. As part of the move, Chandler installed a new offset press. The new press ended the need to produce hot-lead cast type. It also improved the quality of the newspaper's photographs. That same year, Chandler also began using wire service photos to supplement photograph taken by the paper's staff photographers. A new Gross Urbanite offset press was installed in 1980. This new system could print 20,000 sections an hour.

Chandler's interest in technology was not limited to printing machines. In the 1970s, he installed video display terminals to receive electronic feeds from the wire services. In the 1980s, he replaced the video displays with computers. In 1993, a new information systems department was added to The Bulletin organization. In 1996, The Bulletin established its presence on the internet by activating the bendbulletin.com domain. This gave the newspaper its own website, and provided its staff with e-mail connectivity.

== Western Communications ==
Chandler was the founder Western Communications, Inc., a corporation that owns a chain of local newspapers in Oregon and California. After acquiring The Bend Bulletin in 1953, he slowly expanded his newspaper holdings. He eventually combined his newspapers in a single corporation, Western Communications, Inc.

Chandler remained engaged in the company's business throughout his life. However, Chandler transferred ownership of Western Communications to his six children in the early 1990s, giving them seats on the board of directors. In 1993, his daughter, Elizabeth "Betsy" McCool, became chairwoman of the board.

Western Communication's publications included five Oregon newspapers and a weekly shoppers' guide plus two California papers. It was headquartered in Bend, Oregon which is also the home of its flagship newspaper, The Bulletin. Its publications include:

- Baker City Herald, published in Baker City, Oregon
- The Bulletin, published in Bend, Oregon
- Central Oregon Nickel Ads, published in Bend, Oregon
- Curry Coastal Pilot, published in Brookings, Oregon
- The Observer, published in La Grande, Oregon
- The Redmond Spokesman, published in Redmond, Oregon
- The Daily Triplicate, published in Crescent City, California
- The Union Democrat, published in Sonora, California

== Civic leader ==
Throughout his life, Chandler was active in civic affairs. In 1962, Chandler ran for the United States House of Representatives in Oregon's 2nd congressional district. He won the Republican nomination, but was defeated in the general election by the incumbent congressman, Al Ullman.

In 1982, Chandler helped establish the High Desert Museum near Bend. He was the institution's largest financial donor for many years, contributing over $1 million to the museum. His gifts funded many of the museum's exhibits, publications, and educational programs. He also served as chairman of the museum's board of directors in 1989 and 1990.

Chandler generously supported education programs at the University of Oregon and Central Oregon Community College. In 1983, Chandler established the Robert W. Chandler Journalism Scholarship at the University of Oregon. It awards scholarship to undergraduate students majoring in news-editorial at the university's School of Journalism and Communications. In 1985, Chandler and his wife Nancy established the Nancy R. Chandler Visiting Scholar Program at Central Oregon Community College. The program brings renowned scholars to the college to present lectures and lead interactive workshops. The goal of the program is to expose the Central Oregon community to a wide range of perspectives on world events. In 1991, Chandler created the Robert W. Chandler Endowed Lecture Series in Journalism at the University of Oregon School of Journalism and Communication. The program hosts lectures by nationally known journalists that offer students the opportunity to engage renowned journalist in discussions about journalism and democracy.

Chandler was the national president of the Society of Professional Journalists. He served on the board of directors for the American Society of Newspaper Editors and the American Press Institute. He was a Pulitzer Prize juror, a member of Harvard University's Nieman Fellows selection committee, and a senior fellow of Columbia University's Freedom Forum Media Studies Center. In 1990, Chandler was named Oregon Philanthropist of the Year.

He was married to Nancy R. Chandler. The couple had six children: Robert Jr. ("Bobby"), Elizabeth ("Betsy"), Janet, Mary Jean ("Cookie"), Patricia ("Patsy"), and Margaret ("Peggy"). After Nancy's death, Chandler married a second wife, Marjorie. He died of prostate cancer on July 12, 1996. Chandler was cremated and his ashes were scattered over the Three Sisters Wilderness Area as he requested.

== Legacy ==
During his lifetime, Chandler contributed both time and money to the High Desert Museum. In his will, Chandler funded a permanent endowment to support the museum. Today, the High Desert Museum honors patrons who support the museum with financial legacies by making them members of the Robert W. Chandler Society.

The Chandler journalism scholarships and endowed lecture series still benefits students at the University of Oregon. At Central Oregon Community College, the Chandler visiting scholar program continues to host lectures and workshops for central Oregon students.

Every year, the Oregon chapter of the Society of Professional Journalists presents the Bob Chandler Rookie of the Year award to a young journalist. The rookie award recognizes a journalist who has demonstrated outstanding ability in less than two years working in the profession.

In 2006, the Oregon Newspaper Publishers Association inducted Chandler into the Oregon Newspaper Hall of Fame. The hall of fame recognizes people who have made an enduring contribution to the newspaper profession in Oregon.
