= The Bulletin (Bend) =

Daily newspaper published in Bend, Oregon

- Type: Daily newspaper
- Format: Broadsheet
- Owner: Carpenter Media Group
- Founder: Max Lueddemann
- Publisher: Heidi Wright
- Founded: 1903; 123 years ago as the Bend Bulletin
- Headquarters: Bend, Oregon, U.S.
- Circulation: 9,983 Print; 3,762 Digital (as of 2023)
- Sister newspapers: Baker City Herald, The Observer, The Redmond Spokesman, East Oregonian, The Astorian
- OCLC number: 137350069
- Website: bendbulletin.com

The Bulletin is a newspaper in Bend, Oregon, United States. The Bulletin is owned by Carpenter Media Group.

== History ==
=== Establishment ===
To start a newspaper in Bend, a printing press and other publishing equipment items were brought overland from the railhead at Shaniko by freight wagon. The Bend Bulletin was first published as a weekly newspaper on March 27, 1903. At the time, Bend was a mere hamlet in what was then part of Crook County. The newspaper was founded by Max Lueddemann, who at the time operated the Antelope Herald in Antelope. He served as the newspaper's first publisher with Don P. Rea serving as the first editor. When it began, the newspaper's only other employee was a printer named A. H. Kennedy. The newspaper office was located in a rustic cabin on the east bank of the Deschutes River. In the summer of 1904, the newspaper was sold to J. M. Lawrence. He moved the newspaper to an office building in downtown Bend. In that year it consolidated with the Deschutes Echo, which had been launched in 1902 in the neighboring hamlet of Deschutes (now part of the city of Bend).

=== Ownership transitions ===
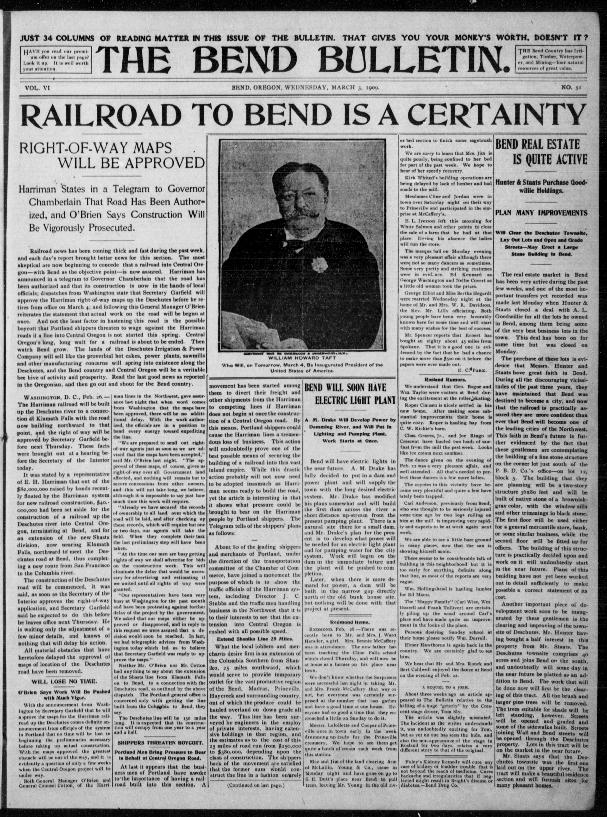
The Bend Bulletin, March 3, 1909

In 1910, George P. Putnam bought the Bend Bulletin from Lawrence. While he was the newspaper's editor for only four years, Putnam continued as publisher for several more years. During his tenure, Putnam was active in local and state politics and the newspaper began promoting Central Oregon outside the local area. In 1916, Deschutes County was carved out of Crook County; a campaign led by the Bulletin was at least partially responsible. On December 6, 1916, the paper switched from daily to weekly publication.

Robert W. Sawyer purchased Putnam's interest in the newspaper in 1919. He hired Henry Fowler, who owned a minority share in the newspaper, as editor. Sawyer was a conservationist, who used his influence as a newspaper publisher to help preserve Oregon's natural resources. In addition to publishing the Bend Bulletin, he served as president of the National Reclamation Association, a director of the American Forestry Association, and a member of the Oregon Highway Commission. He also championed the establishment of numerous state parks as well as leading the effort to preserve key portions of the John Day Fossil Beds. Sawyer continued as publisher of the Bend Bulletin for 34 years. In 1953, Sawyer put the newspaper up for sale. He received offers from several large newspaper chains, but eventually sold the newspaper to Robert W. Chandler. To make the purchase affordable, Sawyer only required a $6,000 down payment.

Chandler ran the newspaper for the next 43 years, first as The Bend Bulletin and after 1963 as The Bulletin. During his tenure, Chandler brought new technology into the newspaper's operation. Soon after he bought the paper, he expanded the photoengraving facilities. In 1956, he replaced the paper's flatbed press with a new rotary press that printed 13,000 32-page sections per hour. The new press also allowed the paper to print photographs in color.

In 1966, The Bulletin moved to a new building on Hill Street in the southern part of Bend. As part of the move, a new offset press was installed. The new press ended the need to produce hot-lead cast type. It also improved the quality of the newspaper's photographs. That same year, The Bulletin began using wire service photos to supplement photographs taken by the paper's staff photographers. In the 1970s, the newspaper installed video display terminals to receive electronic feeds from the wire services. The video displays were replaced with computers a few years later. A new Goss Urbanite offset press was installed in 1980. This new system could print 20,000 sections an hour.

In 1988, three reporters were arrested for criminal trespass for attempting to get the records of hotel-motel taxes from the Deschutes County Commissioners. The Commissioners denied access to the records and the reporters were never prosecuted.

The Bulletin created its website, bendbulletin.com, in 1996.

=== Bankruptcy and sale ===
The Bulletin was owned by Western Communications starting in 1953. The company went through an initial Chapter 11 bankruptcy in 2011 and filed for a second round of Chapter 11 bankruptcy protection in January 2019. Western Communications filed documents in US Bankruptcy Court in Portland in June 2019 indicating that it planned to sell The Bulletin and Redmond Spokesman to Rhode Island Suburban Newspapers for just over $2 million. EO Media Group emerged as a late bidder and won the bankruptcy sale auction on July 29, 2019. Their bid of $3.65 million for The Bulletin and the Redmond Spokesman included investment and loans from civic and business leaders in Bend.

In October 2019, the paper's landmark northwest lodge-style office and printing press building, built on just under 10 acres in 2000, was sold for $13.25 million to Next Development Group. The building was revamped for commercial tenants, with a focus on high tech and R&D. Outside, Inc. announced it would move into the building in November 2021, which had been renamed The Quad at Skyline Ridge. The newspaper relocated to leased offices in the Old Mill District and the Prineville press shop owned by Pamplin Media Group began printing The Bulletin.

On Sept. 13, 2023, the paper announced it would be converting from home delivery services to a mail-only delivery service for all of its newspaper subscribers starting Sept. 26.

=== Central Oregon NewsGuild ===
On Oct. 20, 2023, staff at the Bend Bulletin and Redmond Spokesman announced plans to form a union. The 11 members of union, dubbed the Central Oregon NewsGuild, consists of reporters, news assistants and photographers. On Friday, the union sent a letter to parent company EO Media Group asking it to voluntarily recognize the union. If the company declines, a vote to unionize will be set at a later date.

On Dec. 19, 2023, the writers, photographers and news assistants at The Bulletin and The Redmond Spokesman voted 12–1 in favor of unionizing.

In October 2024, EO was sold to Carpenter Media Group. In June 2024, EO Media Group announced The Bulletin will cease its Sunday print edition and reduce the number of e-editions per week from seven to five.

In December 2024, the paper's copy editor was laid off. The owners also announced plans to layoff a reporter, two photographers and a news clerk. That same month, the union filed a federal labor complaint against Carpenter Media Group arguing the owners were surface bargaining. In May 2026, the union and CMG came to their first contract agreement after three years of negotiations. After recent layoffs, by then the union only had six members, including five journalists and one photographer.

== Notable editors ==
Since its founding, The Bulletin has had a number of distinguished publishers, including George P. Putnam, Robert W. Sawyer, and Robert W. Chandler. All three of these newspapermen are honored in the Oregon Newspaper Hall of Fame. Putnam and Sawyer were inducted in 1980, shortly after the Hall of Fame was created by the Oregon Newspaper Publishers Association. Chandler was inducted in 2006.

Phil Brogan was another well-known journalist associated with The Bulletin. He was hired by Sawyer in 1923, and worked as a reporter, writer, and editor for the next 44 years, earning numerous awards for his work. He was also a distinguished historian, geologist, paleontologist, geographer, meteorologist, astronomer, and outdoorsman. In 1964, Brogan wrote East of the Cascades, an important source of information on the geology, geography, and history of Central Oregon. Phil Brogan Viewpoint near Lava Butte in Newberry National Volcanic Monument is named in his honor.

John Costa was the editor of The Bulletin from 1997 until his retirement in 2016. Erik Lukens returned to The Bulletin in 2016 to become editor. He was the director of editorial and commentary at The Oregonian in Portland from 2012 to 2016, leading the paper to the 2014 Pulitzer Prize for commentary. Prior to joining The Oregonian, Lukens held a variety of newsroom positions at The Bulletin for 14 years. Lukens was not retained when EO Media Group took ownership of the paper.

Gerry O'Brien, formerly of the Klamath Falls Herald and News and several newspapers in Montana, was the editor of The Bulletin from September 2019 to February 2024.
