= Malheur Enterprise =

Weekly newspaper published in Vale, Oregon

- The Voice of Malheur County
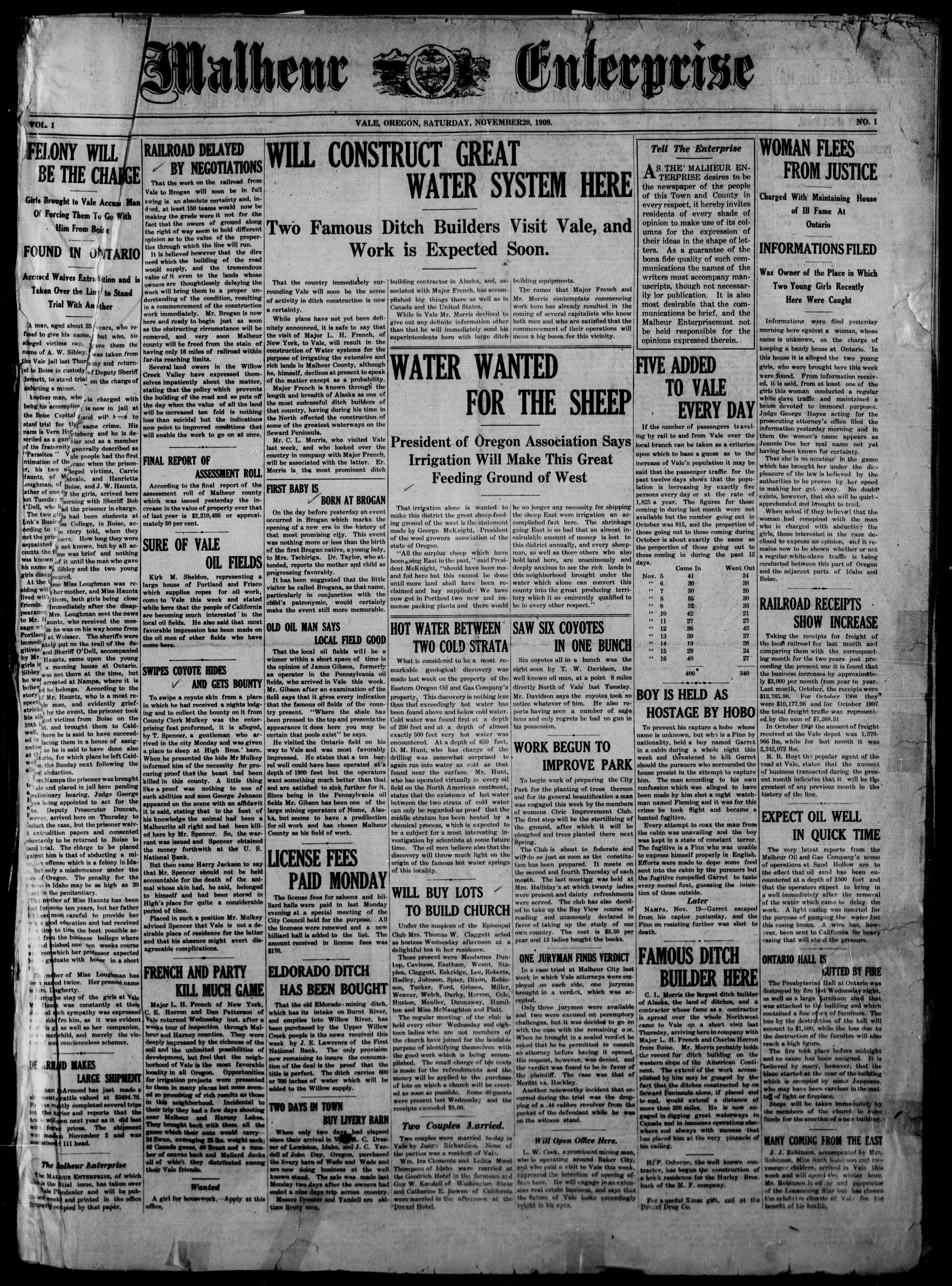
- Front page of Vol. 1, No. 1 (November 20, 1909)
- Type: Weekly newspaper
- Owner(s): Les Zaitz, Scotta Callister, Lyndon Zaitz
- Founder: Major (L. H.) French
- Editor: Les Zaitz
- Founded: 1909
- Ceased publication: May 2025
- Language: English
- City: Vale, Oregon
- Country: United States
- Circulation: 1,207 (as of 2018)
- ISSN: 2835-1835
- OCLC number: 30766823
- Website: malheurenterprise.com

The Malheur Enterprise was a weekly newspaper in Vale, Oregon. It was established in 1909, and was published by Malheur Enterprise Pub. Co. since October 2015 until its last published story in May 2025. Early on, it carried the title Malheur Enterprise and Vale Plaindealer. As of 2018 its circulation was estimated between 1,207 to 1,277. Its print and online circulation in 2022 was approximately 3,000. The newspaper closed in 2025 due to its owners' retirement; the last print edition was published on May 7, 2025, and the last online edition on May 31.

== Early history ==
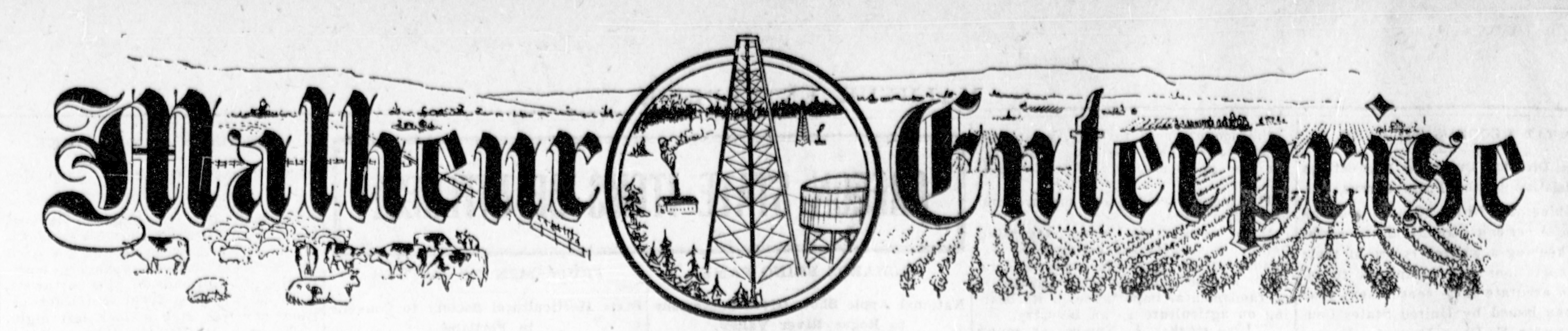
Masthead from the December 4, 1909 issue (Vol. 1, No. 3)

The Enterprise was first published on November 20, 1909, and started out as a regional booster, with financial backing from Major Leigh Hill (L. H.) French. French, who had recently been promoting mining projects in the Klondike gold rush in Alaska and was related by marriage to the Studebaker automobile family, promoted mining, and prizefights. With his backing, the paper envisioned oil wells and irrigation projects as driving a prosperous future for the region. John Rigby, who became the paper's second manager after B.M. Stone in 1912, was credited by Enterprise publisher Arthur H. Bone with rallying public opinion behind the Warm Springs Irrigation District.

John E. Roberts purchased the paper in July 1915, but died a year later. Rigby took charge of the Enterprise again until George Huntington Currey purchased it in 1917, who then traded it in 1920 for the Baker City Herald. In 1922 brothers Winfield S. and Harry Brown, who had founded other eastern Oregon papers, purchased an interest in the paper. The Enterprise played a role in the election of U.S. senator Robert N. Stanfield in 1928.

After eight years, Winfield Brown sold the newspaper to Arthur H. Bone in 1930. He sold it sixteen years later to Robert V. Thurston in 1946. A few years later in 1950 a book covering the county's early days identified the Enterprise as "one of three newsy newspapers still published in Malheur county." Thurston sold the paper in 1956 to Dudley H. Brownhill, who was the son of the founder of the Californian Newspaper Publishers Association. Brownhill previously worked at Hearst and had founded the Lewis River News in Woodland, Washington. Russell Skinner bought the paper in 1959, and sold it two years later to William Jenkins.

The Oregon Education Association commended the Enterprise in 1972 for its "over-all education coverage."

== Revival in the 2010s ==
By 2015, the paper was on the verge of collapse. Oregon journalist Les Zaitz stated it was "arguably the worst newspaper in the state of Oregon". Zaitz had been approaching retirement from his multi-decade position as an investigative reporter for the Oregonian, and was planning to retire with his wife, Scotta Callister, at their Grant County ranch. Upon hearing of the Enterprise's troubles, he and Callister, who was retiring as editor of the Blue Mountain Eagle, along with his brother, Lyndon Zaitz, publisher of Keizertimes, formed the Malheur Enterprise Publishing Company in 2015 to purchase the paper. In a 2016 interview, Zaitz professed no grand ambitions with the paper. At the time of the purchase, the paper only had one reporter. Callister ran the paper for the first year, while Zaitz finished his tenure at the Oregonian.

Zaitz brought a distinguished resume, having earned widespread recognition for his coverage of the 1980 eruption of Mount St. Helens, the Rajneeshpuram community of the 1980s, and the occupation of the Malheur National Wildlife Refuge in 2016. He had also been a Pulitzer Prize finalist twice, for his coverage of non-profits and Mexican drug cartels. By the time he took the helm, he was ready to fully embrace a turnaround, and insisted to his two reporters that they were going to be the "best there ever was", and held their reporting to a high standard. He felt that local newspapers could serve as "laboratories" for the evolving news industry.

The Enterprise became recognized nationally for their investigative reporting and in-depth coverage rather than the standard local coverage typical of small-town newspapers. Subsequent successful projects brought accolades and opportunities, including membership in a national local reporting network. The Enterprise has hosted local talks including political candidate forums and discussions on social services.

In 2024, Zaitz was inducted into the Oregon Newspaper Hall of Fame.

=== Oregon Psychiatric Security Review Board investigation ===
In early 2017, the reporting team uncovered what would prove to be a major scandal. A man who had killed his ex-wife, and whose arrest caused another death, had previously faked insanity to avoid prison on a kidnapping charge. When the Enterprise sought the release of more than 200 records related to his release, the Oregon Psychiatric Security Review Board (OPSRB) sued the Enterprise and its editor. The Enterprise appealed to its readers for legal funds, and Zaitz told the review board that picking a fight with a small paper was like "poking a stick in a badger hole." The Seattle Times published a column supporting the Enterprise, and other influential people and agencies expressed support as well. Oregon governor Kate Brown ultimately intervened, ordering the records released.

When Investigative Reporters and Editors conferred its national FOI (freedom of information) Award to the team of Zaitz, Braese and Caldwell, it marked the first time in the award's 20-year history that it went to a community paper. The team also earned one of three finalist spots for the 2017 annual award in the Scripps Howard Foundation's First Amendment category.

=== ProPublica local reporting network ===
ProPublica, a national news organization, announced in December 2017 that the Enterprise would be one of seven news outlets—and the only weekly paper—selected from a field of 239 to be part of its Local Reporting Network. The award includes the salary of one reporter, as well as extensive support and guidance for their reporting.

In a 2018 editorial written under the Local Reporting Network program, Zaitz told the story of how the paper had effected the release of OPSRB documents and stated that the records he had obtained would contribute to future reporting on related issues.

In November 2018, Zaitz estimated that the paper's circulation had doubled, and revenue tripled, in the preceding three years. Zaitz launched the Salem Reporter in Salem, Oregon in September, 2018.

=== Investigation into economic development and local officials ===
The Enterprise ran a series of articles starting in 2019 investigating state representative Greg Smith's pursuit of economic development projects, notably the Treasure Valley Reload Center (TVRC), a rail shipping facility planned to open in Nyssa in 2020, that ultimately benefited Smith's own consulting firm. Later that year, Smith and Malheur County sheriff Brian Wolfe threatened legal action against the paper, attracting national news media attention. Smith later made an offer to buy the paper, a bid described as "reeking" of self-interest by the publisher of a neighboring newspaper.

The Enterprise continued its coverage of economic development funds and the Smith's conflicting interests into 2022, and sued Smith over public records in September 2022. In early 2023 Smith resigned from the TVRC's board, and that summer Americold, the anticipated operator of the shipping facility, announced its withdrawal from the TVRC; Oregon Public Broadcasting interviewed an Enterprise reporter about the project, and noted the TVRC's numerous setbacks for permitting and financial reasons.

The newspaper later dismissed Smith from its the lawsuit and in May 2023, Malheur County and the public company overseeing TVRC settled with The Enterprise for $40,000, with $20,500 coming from the county and $19,500 from TVRC. The county also agreed to require county officials to get training on Oregon Public Records Law.

In April 2024, The Enterprise was bestowed The First Amendment Award by the Poynter Institute for its reporting on "Malheur County’s lack of transparency and the effect and importance of the paper’s lawsuit against the county to enforce state public records law."

=== Series on childhood poverty in Malheur County ===
The newspaper published a five part series on childhood poverty in Malheur County, authored by five students from the Annanberg journalism school, in 2023.

== Closing ==
The Enterprise published its last story in May of 2025 and closed shortly after due to its inability to find a new owner. Its website is still active as of November 2025 "as an important archive of community news that you may find useful for history and other uses."
