= Salem Reporter =

Newspaper in Oregon, U.S.

- Type: Digital news service
- Owner: Salem Reporter LLC
- Editor: Les Zaitz
- Founded: 2018; 8 years ago
- Language: English
- Headquarters: Salem, Oregon
- Circulation: digital-only
- Website: salemreporter.com

Salem Reporter is a digital news service based in Salem, Oregon.

== History ==
The Salem Reporter was launched in September 2018 by longtime investigative journalist Les Zaitz, with investment from businessman Larry Tokarski, president of a real estate development firm. Its primary revenue source is from reader subscriptions, which cost $10/month. The site aims to distinguish itself from its competitors with the quality and credibility of its reporting. According to local news scholar Damian Radcliffe, the Reporter's freedom from the legacy costs associated with a traditional newspaper like the Statesman Journal has allowed it to enter the field with unusual agility.

Shortly after its launch, the Salem Reporter joined the Pamplin Media Group and the EO Media Group in a partnership named the Oregon Capital Bureau. The bureau was formed by the original partners 2014, to provide its constituent newspapers with reporting on state government; it produces a newsletter called the Oregon Capital Insider. Zaitz leads the bureau's team of three reporters.

Zaitz, a renowned investigative reporter for The Oregonian who, upon his retirement, bought and revitalized the Malheur Enterprise several years prior, saying he was motivated by a desire to create "a new financial paradigm for the newspaper that can be replicated and scaled up." In speeches in 2018, Zaitz emphasized restoring trust in media as a top priority for the journalism industry.

In June 2025, Zaitz bought out Tokarski's share of the company. In August 2026, the Keizertimes was merged into the Reporter. The weekly paper which Zaitz owned ceased its print edition and its website would no longer be updated. However, the paper's sole reporter would continue writing about Keizer for the Reporter and all Keizertimes subscriptions would be switched over to Reporter subscriptions.

== See also ==
- Journalism in Oregon
- List of newspapers in Oregon
