= German language newspapers of Oregon =

Oregon Deutsche Zeitung, launched in 1867, was the first of several German language newspapers published in the U.S. state of Oregon.

The Deutsche Zeitung was published weekly in Portland. C. A. Landenberger, the founder, served as publisher until the paper's demise in 1884. As of 1870, A. Le Grand served as editor. Its circulation in 1880 has been estimated at 800.

A competing paper, Staats Zeitung, was established in 1877, but (according to Oregon news historian George Stanley Turnbull) soon failed. (The 1894 edition of the Pacific States Newspaper Directory listed the Staats Zeitung.) Successors to Deutsche Zeitung included Freie Presse (1885), Nachrichten (1890 through at least 1939), St. Joseph's Blatt, and Armen Seelen Freund (the latter two being Catholic publications issuing from Mount Angel, both established in 1887). In all, there were nine German language papers published in Oregon between 1866 and 1904. St. Joseph's Blatt began in Portland, but soon moved to Mt. Angel, where it became the state's longest-running German language newspaper, lasting until the late 20th century.

In 1917, the Oregon Zeitung was revived: a newly-established paper was published in English and German. The editor was condemned in the national press for what have been described as "bitter attacks" on U.S. president Woodrow Wilson in the run-up to World War I, alleging collusion with Wall Street financial companies and British gold. Under threat of suppression, the publication changed its name to the Portland American, agreed to supply Portland's postmaster with a translation of all content related to the war, and announced a change from daily to weekly publication. It ceased publication that same year.

In a 1917 essay in Oregon Exchanges, a newspaper-focused publication of the University of Oregon journalism program, Joseph Schafer argued that the editors of the Pacific Northwest's German language newspapers appeared to be mostly recent immigrants to the United States, and in some cases connected with official propaganda channels of the German government. Schafer argued that the editor of the Zeitung substantially tempered his positions and rhetoric in response to criticism. Schafer also considered the views expressed in the Washington Staats Zeitung and St. Joseph's Blatt in his essay, and speculated that the views evident in the northwestern German press was "fairly representative of the tone and spirit of the German press throughout America."

== See also ==
- German language newspapers in the United States
