= Phil Brogan =

American journalist (1896–1983)

Philip F. Brogan
- Phil Brogan at the Fort Rock Cave dedication ceremony
- Born: 23 March 1896; The Dalles, Oregon, USA
- Died: 30 May 1983 (aged 87); Denver, Colorado, USA
- Occupations: Journalist and author
- Writing career
- Genre: History
- Subject: Central Oregon
- Notable work: East of the Cascades (1964)
- Notable awards: Oregon Historical Society American Heritage Award (1963); University of Oregon Distinguished Service Award (1963); National Weather Service Thomas Jefferson Award (1960)

Philip Francis Brogan (23 March 1896 – 30 May 1983) was an Oregon journalist and author. He was a reporter, writer, and editor for the Bend Bulletin for 44 years, earning numerous awards for his work. He was also a well known historian, geologist, paleontologist, geographer, meteorologist, astronomer, and outdoorsman. He served as president of the Oregon Geographic Names Board for over twenty years. Brogan wrote East of the Cascades in 1964, an important source of information on the geology, geography, and history of Central Oregon. Brogan was given the title "Father of Oregon Speleology" by Charles V. Larson for his dedication to the study and conservation of caves, particularly Fort Rock Cave, Skeleton Cave and Lavacicle Cave. Phil Brogan Viewpoint near Lava Butte in Newberry National Volcanic Monument is named in his honor.

== Early life ==
Brogan was born on 23 March 1896 in The Dalles, Oregon. He grew up on a stock ranch near Ashwood. As a young man, he worked on ranches in the area around Ashwood and Antelope, Oregon, and then as a sheep camp tender in the Cascade Mountains near the McKenzie Pass. Brogan served as a signalman in the United States Navy during World War I. After the war, he returned to Oregon to work on his uncle's cattle and sheep ranch. Brogan also wrote a few articles for the Antelope Herald newspaper.

In 1919, while working at a sheep camp in the western Cascades a sheep herder from a nearby camp was murdered. Brogan was called to Eugene as a witness. While in Eugene, he applied to the University of Oregon in order to take advantage of a state education program that paid veterans $25 a month for college expenses. Because he had not finished high school, Brogan was required to take a special examination. After passing the test, he entered the university as a journalism student.

To earn spending money and gain reporting experience, Brogan began writing geology related articles for the Eugene Register-Guard. He conducted his research while on field trips with geology professors from the university. After four years, Brogan left the University of Oregon without a degree. He was missing an algebra class and a military training course, which he had never been able to work into his schedule. When he finally received his bachelor's degree thirty years later, it was presented by two of Brogan's university classmates; one was governor of Oregon at the time and the other was governor of Idaho.

== Journalist ==
After leaving the University of Oregon in 1923, Brogan got a job interview with Robert W. Sawyer, owner of the Bend Bulletin. Sawyer was looking for a science writer for the Bulletin. He liked Brogan's geology articles, but that was not enough. To test Brogan's science knowledge, Sawyer pointed out a bright star on the horizon and asked its name, Brogan replied that it was the planet Venus. Brogan was hired and spent the next 44 years as a reporter, writer, and editor for the Bulletin.

Brogan was a popular, awarding winning writer. In addition to writing for the Bulletin, he was also the Central Oregon correspondent for the Portland Oregonian and wrote a popular column in the Sunday Oregonian for many years. Over the course of his career, Brogan trained numerous young journalists including Tom McCall, who later became Oregon's governor. When Brogan retired in 1967, he was one of the best known journalists in the state.

Over the course of his career as a journalist, Brogan won numerous awards. These included the 1954 Amos Voorhies Award, that recognizes Oregon's most outstanding newspaperman; the Fraternal Order of Eagles Civic Award for public service in 1957; the Oregon Historical Society's American Heritage Award in 1963; and the Edith Knight Hill Award from the Association for Women in Communications also in 1963. That same year, Brogan received the University of Oregon Distinguished Service Award, an honor he shared with Senator Wayne Morse.

== Interest in science ==
In 1923, Bend's official weather data were collected by the Bulletin staff at their office. As the newest member of the staff, Brogan was assigned the task of taking daily weather measurements and reporting the information to Portland. He liked the job and continued to collect Bend's official weather data for the next 47 year without missing a day, eventually moving the official weather collection site to his home. When he was out of town his wife recorded the weather data; and when both were away, a group of specially train high school students took the measurements. For his accomplishments, the National Weather Service awarded Brogan its first Thomas Jefferson Award for outstanding service in 1960.

Brogan was a member of the Oregon Geographic Names Board for many years, serving as the board's president from 1947 to 1958 and the then again from 1960 to 1968. He was also a director for the Oregon Museum of Science and Industry, a member of the American Association for the Advancement of Science, director of the Oregon chapter of the American Meteorological Society, and a fellow of the Geographical Society of the Oregon Country. In 1966, when the National Aeronautics and Space Administration brought twenty-two astronauts to Central Oregon to practice Moon walking in the volcanic areas around Bend, Brogan was asked to be their outback guide.

Brogan was interested in a wide range of scientific subjects including geology, paleontology, geography, astronomy, meteorology, forestry, and the environment. By 1970, he had written an estimated four thousand articles on various scientific topics, most were related to Oregon in some way.

== Legacy ==
Over the years, Brogan wrote thousands of articles on Central Oregon history and the area's natural environment. Bob Chandler, owner and publisher of the Bulletin, spent years trying to persuade Brogan to compile his extensive knowledge of Central Oregon into a book. Finally, Chandler order Brogan to work on his book every afternoon until it was finished. The book, East of the Cascades, was published in 1964. At least three editions of the book have been published since 1964. Today, East of the Cascades remains an important source for information on the geology, geography, and history of Central Oregon.

The United States Forest Service named Phil Brogan Viewpoint in his honor. The viewpoint in located at a high point along the Trail of the Molten Land near Lava Butte in the Newberry National Volcanic Monument south of Bend. From the viewpoint, visitors have a panoramic view of the central Cascade peaks.

In 1967, the University of Oregon established an astronomical observatory at Pine Mountain east of Bend. To recognize Brogan's contribution to astronomy, the library at Pine Mountain Observatory was named in his honor in 1970.
