= Chinook Observer =

Weekly newspaper published in Long Beach, Washington

- Type: Weekly newspaper
- Owner: EO Media Group
- Founder(s): George Hibbert; Frank Gaither
- Publisher: Matt Winters
- Founded: 1900
- Headquarters: 205 Bolstad Avenue E. Suite 2 Long Beach, WA 98631
- Circulation: 3,810 Print; 852 Digital (as of 2023)
- ISSN: 0739-9200
- Website: chinookobserver.com

The Chinook Observer is a weekly newspaper serving the Long Beach Peninsula of Washington state. As of about 2013 the paper claimed a circulation of 6,700, making it one of Washington's larger weekly newspapers. The original Linotype machine, a Mergenthaler, was taken out of service in the 1970s and is on loan to the Columbia Pacific Heritage Museum in Ilwaco.

== History ==
In 1900, George Hibbert and Frank Gaither published the first edition of The Observer in Chinook, Washington. The press came from the defunct Tribune in La Conner. Early on Gaither left and was replaced by Charles A. Payne, who worked with Hibbert for nearly a dozen years. In 1912, Payne bought out Hibbert due to a disagreement.

Elton C. Durkee published the paper for about seven years until his sudden death in 1927. His son and daughter-in-law John and Margaret Durkee then took over the paper. In 1937, the couple sold it to John M. Stone That same year James M. O'Neil became the owner. At that time circulation was 325. In 1938, he relocated the Observer to Long Beach as the population of Chinook had drastically dropped in recent years since trap fishing was outlawed.

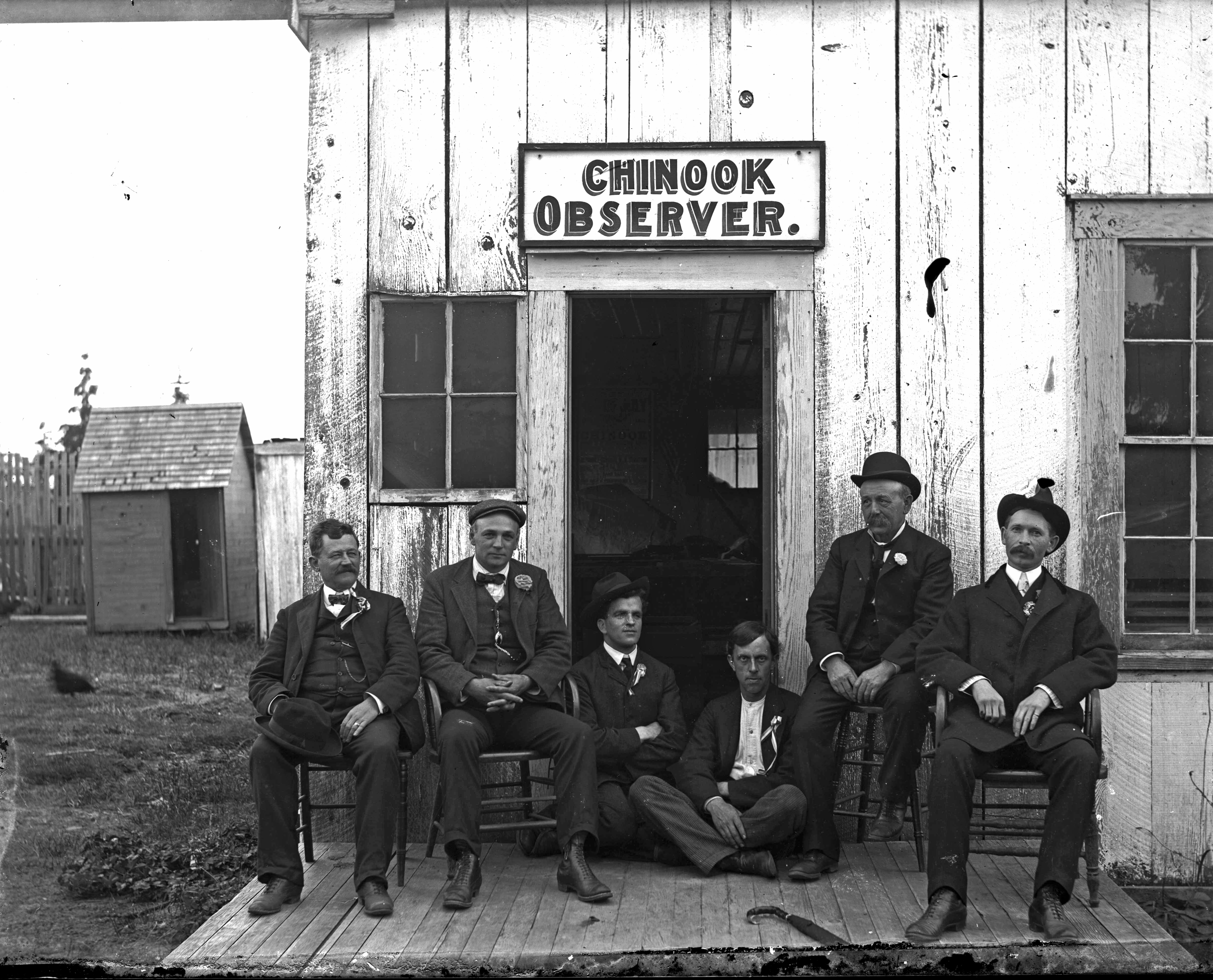
Chinook Observer staff, July 4, 1903, taken at the newspaper's first office

In 1964, O'Neil turned the paper over to his son Wayne O'Neil. Circulation then was around 2,000. He and his wife operated the Observer for the next 20 years. In 1984, the paper was purchased by Craig and Geri Dennis, who sold it in 1988 to the East Oregonian Publishing Company, which later was renamed to EO Media Group. After the sale, printing was moved to The Daily Astorian. Matt Winters became the paper's editor in 1991.

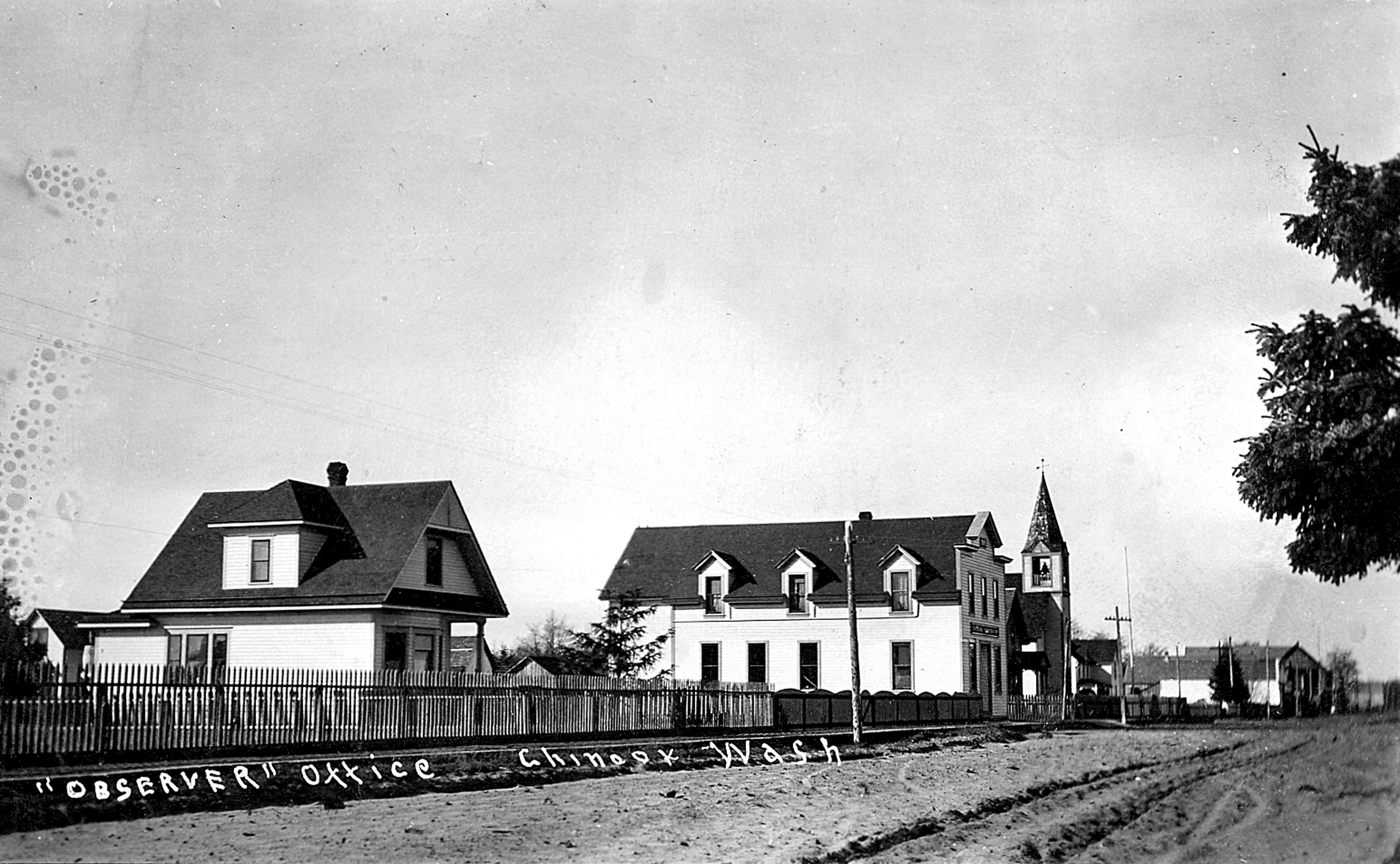
Chinook Observer office, 1905

In April 2024, the newspaper's office was sold. All staff have since worked remotely from their homes. In October 2024, EO Media Group was sold to Carpenter Media Group.
