= Oregon Capital Bureau =

The Oregon Capital Bureau is a website that covers news of the government of the U.S. state of Oregon.

== History ==
The bureau was launched in 2014 by the Pamplin Media Group, which owned 25 newspapers in the Portland Metropolitan Area and Central Oregon, and the EO Media Group, which owned 15 newspapers and two magazines in Eastern and Central Oregon and on the Oregon Coast.

In 2015, the bureau launched the newsletter Oregon Capital Insider. One of the leading advocates of establishing the bureau was Steve Forrester, president of the EO Media Group, and then publisher of the Daily Astorian.

The Salem Reporter was an original partner in the bureau. Former Oregonian investigative reporter Les Zaitz directed the bureau from September 2018 to early 2020.

In spring 2020, the Salem Reporter and Zaitz departed. EO Media and Pamplin Media continued to contribute stories from their capital bureau staff.

The content is now drawn from veteran Salem journalist Dick Hughes, along with articles from Carpenter Media Group, which purchased both EO Media Group and Pamplin Media in 2024.
