= Journalism in Washington =

Journalism in Washington may refer to:

- Journalism in Washington (state)
- Journalism in Washington, D.C.
