= The Portland Black Panthers =

2016 history book by Lucas N. N. Burke

The Portland Black Panthers: Empowering Albina and Remaking a City
- First edition
- Author: Lucas N. N. Burke
- Publisher: University of Washington Press
- Publication date: 2016

The Portland Black Panthers: Empowering Albina and Remaking a City is a history book written by Lucas N. N. Burke, a historian at the University of Oregon, and Judson L. Jeffries, a professor of African and African American Studies at the Ohio State University. It was published by the University of Washington Press in 2016.

The book is organized chronologically and includes images and primary documents concerning the activities of the Black Panther Party in Portland, Oregon. It contains seven sections with five chapters, an introduction, and a conclusion.

== Synopsis ==
The Portland Black Panthers tells the story of the formation of the local branch of the Portland Black Panther Party within the constraints of living in a majority-white city with a tumultuous past regarding race relations. Furthermore, it provides a historical context for these race relations, by highlighting the changes in the black community throughout the 20th century.

== Reception ==
The Portland Black Panthers was reviewed in outlets such as East Oregonian and the Journal of American History, the reviewer for the latter of which stated that it was "a strongly recommended historical account of the relationship between race and place in Portland, Oregon." Nancy Bristow reviewed the work for the Western History Quarterly, calling it "superb".

== See also ==
- African-American history
- Racism in the United States
