= Triplicate =

Triplicate typically refers to a document created three times simultaneously, as with carbonless copy paper.

Triplicate may also refer to:

- Del Norte Triplicate, a newspaper in Crescent City, California
- Triplicate (horse), a race horse owned by dancer, singer, actor Fred Astaire
- Triplicate (Dave Holland album), by jazz musician Dave Holland
- Triplicate (Bob Dylan album), a triple album
- Luornu Durgo aka "Triplicate Girl", a DC Comics super hero
- Triple deity aka "Triplicate deity", three deities worshipped as one
