= Oregon Herald =

19th century newspaper in Portland, Oregon

- Type: Weekly newspaper
- Founder(s): Milton H. Abbott; Nehemiah L. Butler
- Founded: 1866
- Ceased publication: 1873
- City: Portland, Oregon

The Oregon Herald was a newspaper published in Portland, Oregon, United States from 1866 until 1873. It was originally a weekly newspaper, and thus was alternatively known as the Weekly Oregon Herald. However, in 1869 the publication became daily except on Mondays, after which it was alternatively known as the Daily Oregon Herald.

In 2002 a website was launched with the same name. Oregon State Media Inc. was established in 2010, and operated the site after that.

== History ==
At the time the Oregon Herald was established, the only other daily paper in Portland was The Oregonian, all the others having closed. The Democratic paper was started on March 17, 1866 by Milton H. Abbott and Nehemiah L. Butler. Three years later, Abbott started the Democrat in Baker City. Abbott withdrew from the Oregon Herald soon after its establishment and a stock company was formed to manage the paper. Members of this group included Democratic leaders Aaron E. Waite, W. Weatherford, James K. Kelly, La Fayette Grover, Joseph Showalter Smith, N. L. Butler, and James C. Hawthorne. Beriah Brown became editor on June 10, 1866. Sylvester Pennoyer was the next editor, from 1868 to July 1, 1869, after which he sold the paper to T. Patterson & Co, with Eugene Semple as editor. Patterson sold the paper to a stock company on December 1, 1871, and the paper was suspended on May 25, 1873.
