= Robert William Sawyer =

American politician (1880–1959)

Robert W. Sawyer
- Born: 12 May 1880; Bangor, Maine, U.S.
- Died: 13 October 1959 (aged 79); Bend, Oregon, U.S.
- Education: Harvard College and Harvard Law School
- Occupation: Newspaper publisher

Robert William Sawyer (May 12, 1880 – October 13, 1959) was an Oregon journalist and well known conservationist. He was publisher of the Bend Bulletin newspaper for 34 years. Sawyer supported free enterprise, low taxes, limited government, and the Republican Party. He was elected Deschutes County judge shortly after the county was created, and later served on numerous national boards and commission. To recognize his outstanding contribution to journalism, Sawyer was inducted into the Oregon Newspaper Hall of Fame.

== Early life and legal career ==
Robert William Sawyer Jr. was born in Bangor, Maine on May 12, 1880, the oldest child of Robert William Sawyer (1850-1918) and Martha Copp (Paul) Sawyer. His father was involved at various times in the railroad, pulp and paper, and telegraph industries in Maine. Like his father, Sawyer attended Phillips Exeter Academy and Harvard College, graduating from Harvard in 1902 and from Harvard Law School in 1906. He worked as a lawyer in the firm Brandeis Dunbar & Nutter led by future U.S. Supreme Court justice Louis Brandeis.

== Marital Scandal ==
Sawyer married Louise Cushing Dunn (1878-1914) in 1905. They had two sons, Robert III, born 1906, and George, born 1908. In October 1910, Sawyer disappeared along with the wife of his Cambridge neighbor and fellow Brandeis Dunbar & Nutter attorney Edward F. McClennen. (The firm, still in existence, is now known as Nutter McClennen & Fish). Newspaper articles reported that Sawyer and Mary McClennen had been spending a lot of time together since the previous summer. Mary McClennen (née Mary Bigelow Young) had two daughters with McClennen and was apparently two months pregnant when she fled with Sawyer. (Grace Sawyer, her daughter with him, was born in May 1911 in California.) Louise Sawyer was also pregnant at the time. (She gave birth to a third son, Alfred, in March 1911.) McClennen filed for divorce in 1910 and remarried in 1911. The former Mary McClennen, now Mary Sawyer, died in 1977 at the age of 99.

== Publisher ==
Sawyer arrived in Bend, Oregon in 1912. His first job in Bend was as a labor at a local sawmill. In his spare time, he began writing short newspaper articles for the Bend Bulletin. Initially, he anonymously slipped the draft articles under the door of the newspaper office. The editor, George P. Putnam, liked the articles and published them. Eventually, Putnam caught Sawyer delivering one of his anonymous articles and hired him as an associate editor. In 1919, Sawyer purchased Putnam’s interest in the newspaper. Sawyer remained publisher of the Bend Bulletin for the next 34 years.

In 1916, Sawyer was instrumental in separating Deschutes County from Crook County. He also helped establish St. Charles Hospital in Bend. He was elected as Deschutes County judge in 1920, serving in that position until 1927. Sawyer was also appointed to the commission that planned the reconstruct of the Oregon State Capitol, after it burned in 1935. In 1949, Governor Douglas McKay appointed Sawyer chairman of the Oregon’s State Planning Commission to design a new capital campus in Salem, Oregon.

Sawyer was a champion of free enterprise, low taxes, limited government, and the Republican Party. In 1948, Sawyer supported Thomas E. Dewey for President of the United States. As one of Dewey’s major backers, many felt Sawyer was the leading candidate for appointed as Secretary of the Interior if Dewey had won the election.

In 1953, Sawyer put the Bend Bulletin up for sale. He received offers from several large newspaper chains, but eventually sold the newspaper to Robert W. Chandler. To make the purchase affordable, Sawyer only required a $6,000 down payment.

== Conservationist ==
Sawyer was a conservationist, who used his influence as a newspaper publisher to help preserve Oregon’s natural resources. In addition to supporting these causes in the Bend Bulletin, he served as president of the National Reclamation Association; he was a director of the American Forestry Association; and he was secretary-treasurer for the Central Oregon Development League. As a member of the Oregon Highway Commission, he helped ensure forest corridors were retained along major highways throughout the state. Sawyer also championed the establishment of numerous state parks as well as protecting key portions of the John Day Fossil Beds.

== Politics ==
- 1917, involved in the split of Deschutes County from Crook County, Oregon
- 1920 – 1927, Deschutes County judge
- 1927 – 1930, member of the Oregon Highway Commission
- 1931 – 1937, president of the Oregon Reclamation Congress
- 1935, elected Oregon director of the National Reclamation Association
- 1935 – 1939, advisory board for reconstruction of the Oregon State Capitol
- 1939, chairman of the Oregon Capitol Planning Commission.
- 1945 – 1948 Oregon director of the National Reclamation Association
- 1946 – 1947 president of the National Reclamation Association
- 1945 – 1951, vice-chairman of the Oregon Statuary Hall Commission

== Later life ==
After selling the Bend Bulletin, Sawyer remained active in public affairs and continued to support conservation groups, serving on numerous boards. In the mid-1950s, he served on the Second Hoover Commission, a national task force that assessed water and power resources within the United States. Sawyer died in Bend on 13 October 1959 at the age of 78.

== Legacy ==
The State of Oregon created Robert Sawyer State Park in 1931. Covering 45 acres (0.18 km^{2}), the park is located along the Deschutes River at the north end of Bend. The state transferred the park property to the city of Bend in 1980. To recognize his outstanding contribution to journalism, the Oregon Newspaper Publishers Association inducted Sawyer into the Oregon Newspaper Hall of Fame in 1980.
