= Blue Mountain Eagle (newspaper) =

Weekly newspaper published in John Day, Oregon

- Type: Weekly newspaper
- Owner: Carpenter Media Group
- Publisher: Kari Borgen
- Associate editor: Justin Davis
- Founded: 1898
- Headquarters: 195 N. Canyon Boulevard; John Day, OR 97845
- City: John Day, Oregon
- Country: United States
- Circulation: 1,690 Print; 323 Digital (as of 2023)
- Website: bluemountaineagle.com

The Blue Mountain Eagle is a weekly newspaper published on Wednesdays in John Day, Oregon. It is a newspaper of record for Grant County.

== History ==
The Blue Mountain Eagle was established in 1898, and has undergone a long string of mergers in the decades since.

In 1908, P. F. Chandler, who owned the Grant County News, formed a partnership with Clint P. Haight to purchase the Blue Mountain Eagle and merge it with the News. The two ran the paper for decades until Haight sold his interests in 1941 to Chandler, who died the following year. The paper was inherited by his son W. Glen Chandler. In 1945, the Eagle merged with the John Day Valley Ranger, owned by Chester A. Ashton.

In 1948, the newspaper was sold to Elmo Smith, who went on to found Eagle Newspapers. He sold it to Donna and John Moreau in 1968. The newspaper was acquired by the East Oregonian Publishing Company in 1979. It began an online edition in 2000. The company changed its name to EO Media Group in January 2013.

Editor Scotta Callister left the paper in 2015 to become part-owner and interim publisher of the Malheur Enterprise, which had great success under her leadership and that of her husband, Les Zaitz. Publisher Marissa Williams left in 2018 after 14 years with the company, with Kathryn Brown taking over as interim publisher. During Williams' tenure, the Eagle's coverage of Aryan Nation's failed effort to establish a headquarters in Grant County earned a Pulitzer Prize nomination.

In June 2024, EO Media Group announced Blue Mountain Eagle will cease print publication and go online-only. All print subscribers will instead receive the East Oregonian, published weekly and including news from Blue Mountain Eagle's website. The company was purchased by Carpenter Media Group in October 2024. The newspaper then listed its building for sale in November 2024. The property had housed the paper since it was built in 1997.
