= Burns Times-Herald =

Weekly newspaper published in Burns, Oregon

- "Covers Harney County like the Sagebrush."
- A front page from 2015
- Type: Weekly newspaper
- Owner: NBG Media
- Founder(s): David Louis Grace, Nellie R. Grace
- Editor: Nolan Graham
- Founded: 1887
- Headquarters: 355 N Broadway Ave, Burns, OR
- City: Burns, Oregon
- Country: United States
- Circulation: 2,941
- Website: btimesherald.com

The Burns Times-Herald is a weekly newspaper serving the city of Burns, Oregon, and the surrounding Harney County area. The paper's motto is "Covers Harney County like the Sagebrush".

Julian Byrd managed the paper for 40 years, and was considered instrumental in bringing the telephone, electricity, and movies to the rural city, as well as advocating for railroad lines. The newspaper changed ownership many times from 1930 to 2006, when the paper's journalists bought it, in the state's first staff buyout.

== History ==
About six newspapers were consolidated over several decades to result in the Burns Times-Herald. The first paper published in Burns, Oregon was the Harney Valley Item. Horace A. Dillard first published the Item in July 1885 as a four-page, six column patent-out paper printed by Washington hand press. After two years he sold it to J. M. Vaughn. It was later absorbed into what would become the Times-Herald.

The second paper started in Burns was the East Oregon Herald, founded by David Louis Grace and Nellie R. Grace in November 1887. A century later, the paper would outlive or consolidated with 34 papers to become the only title published in Harney County. Julian Byrd joined the Graces as an apprentice. At the time he was 15 and his brother Charles A. Byrd, 21, was already working for the Graces as a compositor. Julian Byrd became the printer's devil in December 1889, and his father W. C. Byrd bought the Herald around 1890. That same year Charles Byrd went on to buy the Item and published it for three years. Julian Byrd went on to buy the Harney Times and merged it with the Herald to form the Burns Times-Herald. He also later purchased and absorbed the Burns Tribune into his paper.

After her husband died, Nellie R. Grace started another newspaper called the Harney County News in January 1893. She sold the paper six years later. By 1926, the News was owned by Douglas Mullarky. In 1930, Julian Byrd merged his Burns Times-Herald with rival Douglas Mullarky's Burns News. The consolidated paper kept the Times-Herald name, with staff working out of the News' office. The Times-Herald became a daily newspaper in 1933, but reverted back to a weekly in 1939. The two men ran the paper together for decades until Mullarky was killed in 1957, the victim of a hit and run at age 59. His widow and Byrd, who has been bedfast at the hospital for years, sold the paper to a new cooperation formed by two local business owners. Byrd died about two years later.

Dwight and Ethel Hinshaw published the paper for about 15 years from 1960 until retiring in the mid-1970s. In 1976, the Burns Times-Herald was purchased by Western Communications. The paper was sold to out-of-state owners in November 2006, who then announced job cuts. In response, five employees, with a $35,000 grant from the Southeast Regional Alliance, formed a partnership called Survival Media and purchased the Times-Herald.
