= Journalism in Washington (state) =

Journalism in Washington (then a U.S. territory) began with the publication of newspapers in the cities of Port Townsend, Steilacoom, and Olympia in the 1860s. By then, there had been journalism in Oregon for as long as a decade.

== See also ==
- List of newspapers in Washington (state)
- Wikipedia:WikiProject Missing encyclopedic articles/List of US Newspapers/Washington
- List of African-American newspapers in Washington (state)
