= Western Communications =

Western Communications, Inc.
- Founded: 1953
- Founder: Robert W. Chandler
- Defunct: 2019
- Successor: EO Media Group
- Headquarters location: Bend, Oregon
- Publication types: Newspapers

Western Communications, Inc. was an American newspaper publisher serving the states of Oregon and California from 1953 to 2019. The family-owned company was based in Bend, Oregon and was founded by Robert W. Chandler. Its flagship paper was The Bulletin.

== History ==
Robert W. Chandler bought The Bulletin in 1953 and built his newspaper company up over the ensuing decades, prior to his death in 1996. The company was recognized by an Oregon State University awards program in 1995, for an effective ownership transition from Chandler to his daughter, Elizabeth McCool, and for remaining actively engaged in its community. At the time, the chain consisted of eight papers and employed 300 people. When the company bought The Redmond Spokesman from Mary Brown in 1971, it owned radio stations in Oregon and California.

Western Communications purchased the La Grande Observer in 1959, Baker City Herald in 1967, The Redmond Spokesman in 1971, Burns Times-Herald in 1976, Curry Coastal Pilot in 1981, Del Norte Triplicate in 1988 and The Hermiston Herald in 1992 but would sell it in 2008 to EO Media Group. The Union Democrat was purchased in 1998. The company built a large headquarters building in Bend in 2000. In 2006, the Burns Times-Herald was sold.

The company filed for Chapter 11 bankruptcy in 2011, seeking to renegotiate an $18 million loan, and hoping to complete the bankruptcy proceedings within six months. In 2012, the company did emerge from bankruptcy, but also laid off 10% of its staff, due to a sharp decline in advertising revenue from legal notices. In 2017, it listed its headquarters building for sale, but no offer had been accepted as of January 2019, and the company had fallen behind on payments of state taxes. The debt the company owes is estimated at $26 million. In January 2019, the company again filed for bankruptcy protection. Two papers were sold to Country Media, one was sold to RISN Operations and the remaining properties were sold to EO Media Group.

== Newspapers formerly published by Western Communications ==
Title	Year acquired	Year sold or closed	Fate
The Bulletin	1953	2019	Sold to EO Media Group
The Observer	1959	2019	Sold to EO Media Group
Baker City Herald	1967	2019	Sold to EO Media Group
The Redmond Spokesman	1971	2019	Sold to EO Media Group
Burns Times-Herald	1976	2006	Sold to out-of-state owners
Curry Coastal Pilot	1981	2019	Sold to Country Media, Inc
The Daily Triplicate	1988	2019	Sold to Country Media, Inc
The Hermiston Herald	1992	2008	Sold to EO Media Group
The Union Democrat	1998	2019	Sold to RISN Operations
