= Oregon Geographic Names Board =

Board responsible for naming geographic features in Oregon

- Official logo adopted in 2002

Agency overview
- Formed: 1908
- Jurisdiction: State of Oregon
- Headquarters: Portland, Oregon, USA
- Agency executives: Champ C. Vaughan, Board president; Dr. George L. Vogt, Board secretary
- Parent agency: Oregon Historical Society
- Website: Oregon Geographic Names Board

The Oregon Geographic Names Board (originally known as the Oregon Geographic Board) is responsible for recommending names for geographic features in the state of Oregon. The board submits its recommendations to the United States Board on Geographic Names for approval. In 1959, administrative responsibility for the board was transferred from the state government to the Oregon Historical Society.

== Board responsibility ==
Today, the Oregon Geographic Names Board is responsible for recommending names for geographic features within the state of Oregon. It ensures standard geographic nomenclature is applied to Oregon place names and prevents name duplication. The board assists federal, state, and local governments by reviewing geographic name proposals. The board submits its recommendations to the United States Board on Geographic Names for approval.

== History ==
In 1890, President Benjamin Harrison established the United States Board on Geographic Names. The board was given responsibility for settling questions regarding the names of geographic features within the United States. The board was needed because inconsistencies in place names were causing serious problems for surveyors, map makers, and scientists who required uniform geographic nomenclature. This problem was especially acute in the western states and territories where explorers, soldiers, miners, and settlers all had a hand in naming geographic features in addition to the names given to features by Native Americans. In 1906, President Theodore Roosevelt expanded the board's charter to include responsibility for approving all new place names and name changes on behalf of the U.S. government. In addition, the board was specifically directed to standardize and document geographic names of all domestic, foreign, or undersea features. Today, Antarctic names are within the U.S. board's jurisdiction as well.

The Oregon Geographic Board was established by Governor George Chamberlain in an executive order signed on October 1, 1908. It was created to assist the United States Board on Geographic Names in naming geographic features within the state of Oregon. In 1911, the U.S. Board formally recognized the Oregon Board as its official advisory body for Oregon geographic names.

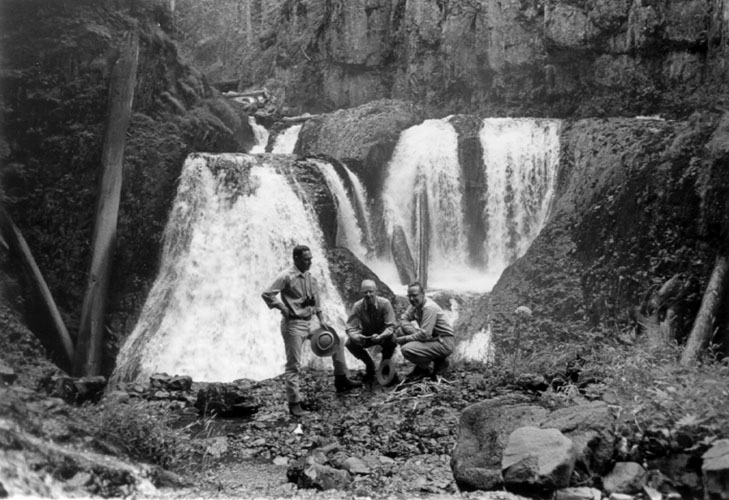
Members of the Oregon Geographic Names Board posing in front of "Frustration Falls" on the Salmon River, Salmon–Huckleberry Wilderness, Mt. Hood National Forest, Oregon. This photo was taken during a 1963 expedition to name the waterfalls in the Salmon River Gorge. The men pictured are thought to be Thomas Vaughan of the Oregon Historical Society, Herb Stone of the U.S. Forest Service and Donald Sterling, Editor of the Oregon Journal.

In October 1908, Governor Chamberlain appointed William Gladstone Steel, Doctor Joseph Schafer, and John B. Horner to the board. In December of that year, he added George H. Himes and Major Thomas L. "Lee" Moorhouse to the board. The members selected Steel, a well known outdoorsman and advocate for national parks, as the board's first president. On December 26, 1908, the Oregon Geographic Board took its first action in recommending that Mount Pitt in Jackson County be changed to Mount McLoughlin in honor of Doctor John McLoughlin, head of Hudson's Bay Company in the Oregon Country from 1825 until 1846.

After Steel left the board in 1911 to devote his time to the development of Crater Lake National Park, the board elected George H. Himes as its president, a position he held until his death in 1940. Himes was one of Oregon's most respected historians and also a founder of the Oregon Historical Society, as well as museum curator from 1915 to 1940.

In 1914, Governor Oswald West appointed Lewis A. "Tam" McArthur to the board. McArthur was a Pacific Power and Light Company executive with a passion for geography and history. In 1916, he was selected board secretary, a position he held until 1949. McArthur's position on the board allowed him to study journals of early explorers, read pioneer diaries, browse newspaper archives, research government documents, and thoroughly reviewed every book on Oregon history he could find. He also conducted personal interviews with living Oregon pioneers. The Oregon Historical Society published his research in eight issues of the Oregon Historical Quarterly in the early 1920s. In 1928, McArthur paid to have the first edition of Oregon Geographic Names published. The book was quickly recognized as the authoritative source for information regarding the origins and history of Oregon place names. A second edition was published in 1944. The book's third edition was published in 1951, shortly after his death.

Another long-serving member of the Oregon Geographic Board was the well known newspaper journalist and science writer Phil Brogan of Bend. Brogan served as president of the board from 1947 to 1958 and then again from 1960 until 1968.

In 1959, Governor Mark Hatfield transferred the administration of the Oregon Geographic Board from the state government to the Oregon Historical Society. As part of the reorganization, the name of the board was officially changed to the Oregon Geographic Names Board. The membership was also increased and the executive director of the Oregon Historical Society became the board's permanent secretary. The board secretary was also given responsibility for appointing new members to the board. The first board secretary under this arrangement was Thomas Vaughan, who served as permanent secretary from 1959 until 1989. Today, the board is still associated with the Oregon Historical Society, which maintains the board's records and provides limited administrative support.

In 2001, members of the Confederated Tribes of Warm Springs persuaded the Oregon Legislative Assembly to pass a law requiring that many place names including the word squaw be changed.

== Membership ==
The Oregon Geographic Names Board has twenty-five members representing all geographic areas of the state. They are selected by the board secretary for their knowledge of Oregon geography and history. Board members are appointed to three-year terms and serve without compensation. The board members elect the board president and vice-president for two-year terms. The executive director of the Oregon Historical Society serves as the board's permanent secretary. In addition, the board is supported by advisers from state and federal land management and mapping agencies as well as the Oregon Historical Society.

== Board presidents ==
Members of the Oregon Geographic Names Board elect the board president. Since the board was established in 1908, these individuals have served as president:

- William G. Steel, 1908–1911
- George H. Himes, 1911–1940
- Merle R. Chessman, 1940–1947
- Phil F. Brogan, 1947–1958
- Bernal Hug, 1958–1959
- Phil F. Brogan, 1960–1968
- Eric Allen, Jr., 1968–1973
- J. Herbert Stone, 1973–1980
- William Wessinger, 1980–1986
- Tom McAllister, 1986–1999
- Kathleen Beaufait, 1999–2003
- Champ C. Vaughan, 2003–2010
- Sharon Nesbit, 2010–present
