= Wallowa County Chieftain =

Weekly newspaper published in Enterprise, Oregon

- Type: Weekly newspaper
- Owner: EO Media Group
- Founder: S. A. Heckethorn
- Founded: 1884
- Headquarters: 209 N.W. First St. Enterprise, OR 97828
- City: Enterprise, Oregon
- Country: United States
- Circulation: 1,916 Print; 373 Digital (as of 2023)
- Website: wallowa.com

The Wallowa County Chieftain is a weekly newspaper in Enterprise, Wallowa County in the U.S. state of Oregon.

== History ==
Founded in Joseph in 1884 by S. A. Heckethorn, the newspaper preceded the establishment of the county itself. A few years after Enterprise was selected as the county seat, the paper relocated there. Though the newspaper was named after Chief Joseph, it was not particularly friendly to Native American issues, and opposed a Joseph's request to resettle Wallowa Valley in 1900.

George Cheney became the owner, editor, and publisher in 1911, on the wave of an economic boom experienced in Enterprise upon the completion of a railroad and sawmill, as well as a booming agricultural business. Cheney built a new building, designed to meet the needs of the paper, which it occupied beginning in 1916. Cheney sold the Enterprise Chieftain in 1941 to Gwen Tappen Coffin. Under Coffin, the paper absorbed the Wallowa Sun in 1942 to form the Wallowa Chieftain, and then the Chief Joseph Herald in 1959 to become the Wallowa County Chieftain.

Coffin was a "controversial editor" who wrote columns opposing the internment of Japanese Americans, opposing the Vietnam War and opposing increased logging in federal forests. He was inducted into the Oregon Newspaper Hall of Fame in 1993 and died the following year. Coffin operated the paper until 1971. He sold the Chieftain to his son-in-law Don Swart Sr., who operated the paper until selling it to his son and daughter-in-law Richard and Cheryl Swart in 1998. In March 2000, the East Oregonian Publishing Co. purchased the newspaper from Richard and Cheryl Swart.

In June 2024, EO Media Group announced that the Wallowa County Chieftain would cease print publication and go online-only. All print subscribers would instead receive the East Oregonian, published weekly and including news from the Wallowa County Chieftain's website. In October 2024, the company was sold to Carpenter Media Group. In December 2024, the paper's editor was laid off, leaving only one reporter to cover Wallowa and Union counties.

== See also ==
- Wallowa County Chieftain Building
