= Oregon Psychiatric Security Review Board =

Psychiatric Security Review Board
Agency overview
- Formed: 1977
- Jurisdiction: Oregon
- Headquarters: Portland
- Key document: ORS § 161.385 et seq.
- Website: www.oregon.gov/PRB

The Oregon Psychiatric Security Review Board (PSRB) supervises people who have successfully asserted the insanity defense to a criminal charge (Guilty Except for Insanity or GEI) in the state, and grants relief from sex offender registrations for GEI sex offenders and firearm possession bans because of mental health determinations.

== History ==
It was created by an Act of July 14, 1977 which became operative on January 1, 1978.

== News coverage ==
The board was the subject of widespread news coverage when the board sued the Malheur Enterprise, a small weekly newspaper in Vale, to keep the board's records secret after the Oregon Attorney General ordered their release. The records concerned a psychiatric patient of the Oregon State Hospital committed in 1997 after kidnapping and threatening to kill his wife and son, who the PSRB released because he likely didn't suffer from (and likely never had) a mental disease or defect, and then was subsequently 3 weeks later accused of kidnapping and murdering his ex-wife.
