= Keizertimes =

Weekly newspaper published in Keizer, Oregon

- You think you know. To be sure, read Keizertimes
- Type: Weekly newspaper
- Owner: Wheatland Publishing Corp.
- Founder: John Ettinger
- Publisher: Lyndon Zaitz
- Editor: Eric A. Howald
- Founded: 1979
- Ceased publication: 2026
- Language: English
- Headquarters: 142 Chemawa Road N. Keizer, OR 97303
- Circulation: 1,738
- ISSN: 2997-2604
- OCLC number: 28445028
- Website: keizertimes.com

The Keizertimes was a weekly community newspaper based in Keizer, Oregon, United States, published every Friday, and has a distribution through both the mail and newsstands. It was founded in 1979 and ceased in 2026 after merging into the Salem Reporter.

== History ==
=== Keizer News ===
The earliest predecessor to the Keizertimes is the Keizer News, founded in August 1950 by members of the Keizer Commercial Club. The News was briefly suspended for about two weeks in July 1952 until Lynn E. Martin, formerly a foreman at the Independence Enterprise, agreed to purchase and relaunch it.

Martin published the paper for 11 years until selling it in June 1963 to Clarence Zaitz, who for the past three months was city editor at the Capital Journal. The new owner soon purchased $6,000 worth of equipment in order to have the paper printed by an offset press run by the Tualatin-Yamhill Press in Hillsboro.

In February 1965, Clarence Zaitz announced plans to launch a second weekly in town called the South Salemite, and despite reaching a circulation of 2,500, it folded after a year.

In May 1968, the News ceased after 19 years of operation due to it being unprofitable. Clarence Zaitz was unable to find a buyer, and while his son Leslie Zaitz considered taking it over, he opted to work as a reporter for The Oregonian instead. Clarence Zaitz was later hired as Salem bureau manager for the United Press International, and after five years got a job at United California Bank.

=== Revival attempts ===
In January 1970, Jim Anderson launched a new paper called The Keizer News. After Clarence Zaitz objected to the name, that March, it was renamed to The Keizer Times & Ad-Visor. The paper soon ceased. In November 1971, Ed O'Neill launched the Keizer Tribune, but this also ceased in March 1972.

=== Keizertimes ===
John Ettinger moved to Keizer in the late 1970s and was encouraged by local merchants to launch his own newspaper. On Oct. 3, 1979, Ettinger published the first bi-weekly edition of The Keizer Times, with the name stylized as Keizertimes. Initially Bob Brazeau was editor, but he soon left Ettinger as the paper's only employee. Ettinger had no prior journalism experience, and moved from California to the area about 2 and half years to work as director of the Oregon branch of the Association of Retarded Citizens. He started the paper because "It just seemed like a good idea." Start up costs for the Times were $2,000, and each issue cost $1,000 to produce. The paper was printed by the Silverton Appeal Tribune, with 7,000 copies mailed to local homes and another 1,000 distributed at area grocery stores. Ettinger estimated about 70% of recipients never read the paper, with its most popular feature being a historical column.

In 1981, the paper grossed $50,000 on advertisement sales with a net profit of $15,000. Ettinger said profits were meager, but were enough to support himself and his wife Connie, who worked as circulation director and bookkeeper. Soon the paper was delivered 9,500 homes, almost every one in Keizer, "except the ones with big dogs," Ettinger said. Encouraged by the results of an informal telephone survey of 200 households, in April 1982, the paper switched from a free twice monthly model to a weekly paid-subscription model. Charging $9.50 annually, or 18 cents weekly, was estimated to bring in $60,000 in subscription fees alone.

In August 1987, after eight years of ownership, Ettinger sold the Keizertimes to Leslie L. "Les" Zaitz and Scotta Callister. The couple launched the South Salem Times a year later, but it folded in 1990. They also launched the Salem Times, a free newspaper mailed to 40,000 homes, in 1994. It ceased after two years. In 2004, the Keizertimes' office caught fire and sustained major damage. Arson was suspected. In September 2018, Les Zaitz launched the Salem Reporter, a digital news service based in Salem. It was funded by businessman Larry Tokarski, president of a real estate development firm. In August 2026, the Keizertimes was merged into the Reporter. Its print edition ceased, its office closed and its website would no longer be updated. The paper's sole reporter would continue writing about Keizer for the Reporter.

== Awards ==
In 1988, the Keizertimes won a first place award for best news story from a small weekly newspaper from the National Newspaper Association. The story was on the death of an elderly pedestrian. In 2000, the paper's publisher Les Zaitz was given the First Citizen Award by the Keizer Chamber of Commerce. In 2024, Les Zaitz was inducted into the Oregon Newspaper Hall of Fame.
