= Treasure Valley Reload Center =

Shipping facility in Oregon, United States

General information
- Location: Nyssa, Oregon; United States
- Coordinates: 43°54′55″N 116°59′25″W
- System: Truck-to-rail intermodal
- Owner: Malheur County Development Corp.

Construction
- Structure type: Warehouse

Other information
- Status: Under development
Location

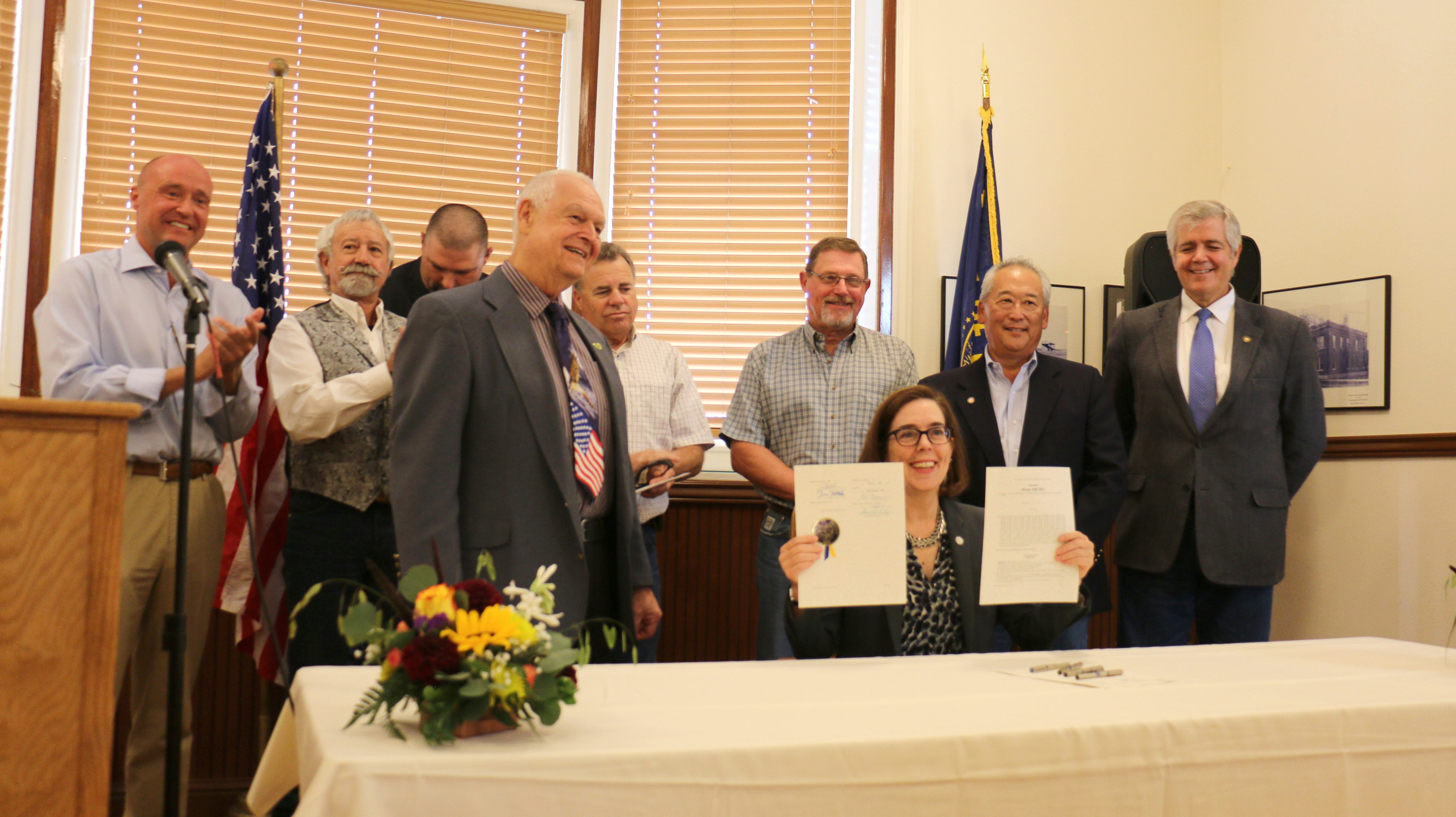
Oregon Governor Kate Brown and others in August 2017 at a signing ceremony for the transportation funding bill HB 2017

The Treasure Valley Reload Center is a planned truck-to-rail shipping facility slated to open near Nyssa, Oregon, on the border of the U.S. states Oregon and Idaho as part of the Arcadia Industrial Park acquisition and development. Seen as a significant economic development opportunity for the state's poorest county (Malheur), the project received $26 million from state funds that were earmarked during the 2017 Oregon legislative session, and construction was supposed to begin by 2020. Nyssa also directed $3 million in federal funds toward the project, and in 2022 the Oregon Legislature approved an additional $3 million in an emergency grant. Onion farmers looking to ship their crops to markets in the Midwest would be among the main beneficiaries of the project.

The industrial park was supposed to receive $15 million through a federal grant in 2020, but the application was "botched" and rejected by the U.S. Department of Transportation as unacceptable.

Permitting and financial issues have resulted in significant delays to construction of the reload center. The property would be located on a wetland, which necessitated compliance with relevant regulations. In 2023 state representative Greg Smith, who had been criticized in the press for conflicts of interest, resigned from the project. He was succeeded by attorney Shawna Peterson, who reported "significant progress" at a chamber of commerce luncheon.

Advocates sought additional funding from the Oregon Legislature to close an anticipated $8.5 million budget shortfall; local lawmakers Lynn Findley (Republican senator) and Mark Owens (Republican member of the state house) wanted a close look into the project's finances prior to endorsing the request, "because of history of the project and the taint surrounding it." Americold, the anticipated operator of the shipping facility, announced its withdrawal from the TVRC in July 2023. News coverage again noted setbacks due to permitting and financial reasons.

Governor Tina Kotek, who supported the initial funding for the reload center while speaker of the Oregon House of Representatives, visited the county in July 2023, shortly after Americold's withdrawal. She reiterated her support for the project and endorsed incoming project manager Shawna Peterson.
