= Capital Press =

Agricultural newspaper published in Salem, Oregon

Capital Press Agriculture Weekly
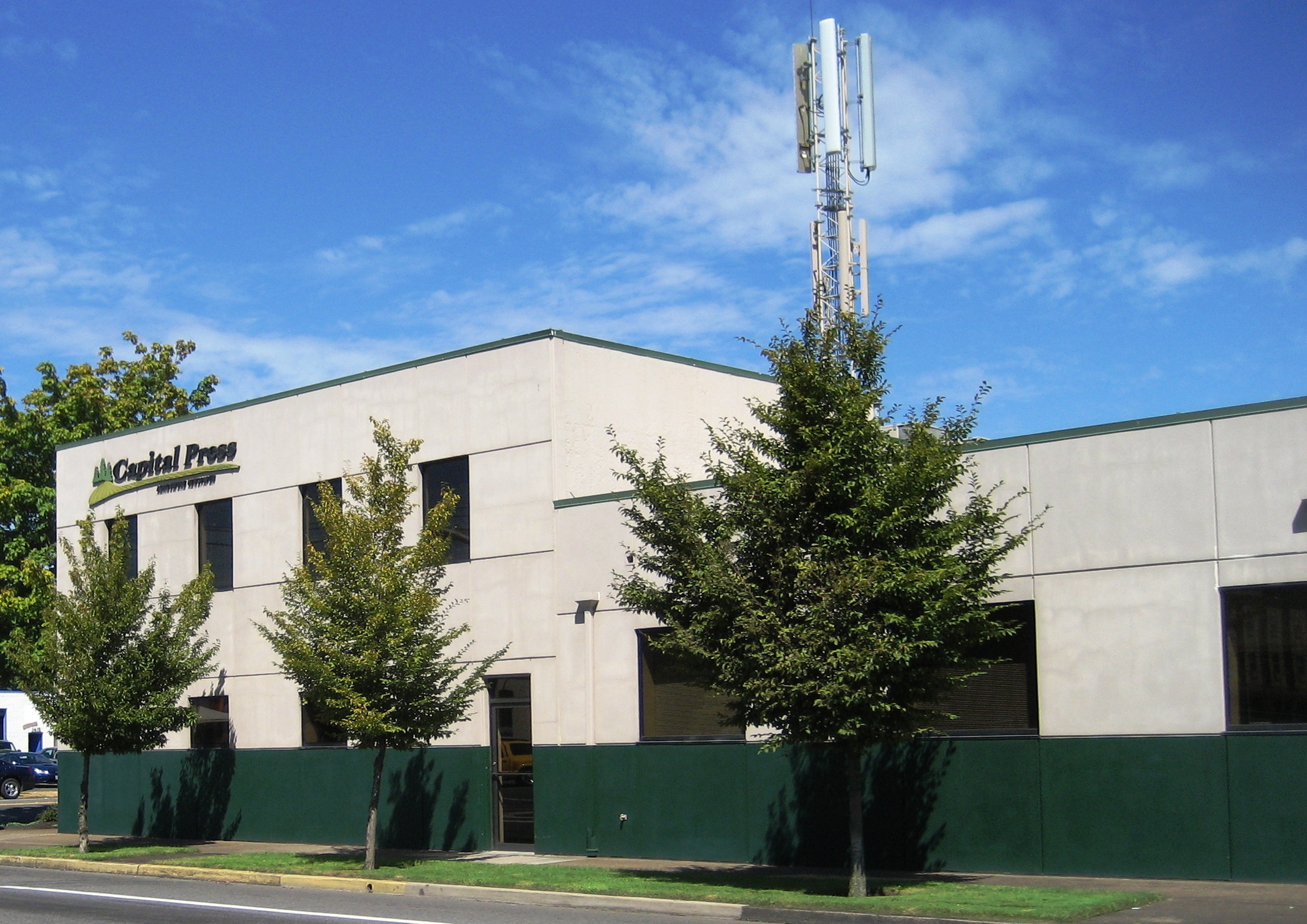
- Headquarters in Salem
- Type: Weekly newspaper
- Format: Broadsheet
- Owner: EO Media Group
- Founder: Abner M. Church
- Publisher: Joe Beach
- Founded: 1928
- Headquarters: 1400 Broadway St. NE; Salem, OR 97301; United States
- Circulation: 20,090 Print; 1,183 Digital (as of 2023)
- ISSN: 2767-9721
- OCLC number: 180688805
- Website: capitalpress.com

The Capital Press is a weekly agricultural newspaper covering the West Coast of the United States, and published in Salem, Oregon. The newspaper covers farming, ranching and agriculture industries in the Pacific Northwest. The newspaper is owned by the EO Media Group.

== History ==
The newspaper was established in February 1928 as the Hollywood Press by Abner M. Church as a community newspaper serving a portion of Oregon's capital city. The name of the newspaper was changed in December 1932 to Capital Press.

Church sold the paper to Dewey Rand Sr. and Henry M. Hanzen in 1946. At the time the paper focused solely on covering the Hollywood neighborhood in Salem. The Rand family changed the paper's focus in the 1960s to agricultural after noticing that many farmers bought classified ads in newspaper and thought they were an underserved market. In 1990, Dewey Rand Jr. sold the newspaper to the East Oregonian Publishing Company.

Bill Duncan published a column from 1981 until his death in 2011; the News Review of Roseburg, Oregon deems it "still pertinent" and is republishing it as of 2018.

In October 2024, EO Media Group was sold to Carpenter Media Group.
