= The Redmond Spokesman =

Weekly newspaper published in Redmond, Oregon

- Front page on 22 August 2007
- Type: Weekly newspaper
- Owner: EO Media Group
- Publisher: John Carr
- Editor: Tim Trainor
- Founded: 1910
- Headquarters: 361 NW Sixth Street; Redmond, Oregon 97756
- Circulation: 773 Print; 185 Digital (as of 2023)
- ISSN: 2834-1341 (print); 2834-135X (web)
- OCLC number: 22248942
- Website: redmondspokesman.com

The Redmond Spokesman is a weekly newspaper published in Redmond, Oregon, United States. It serves the city of Redmond and neighboring communities in northern Deschutes County, focusing on local news and events. The Spokesman was founded in 1910 by Henry H. Palmer. Since 2019, the paper has been owned by EO Media Group.

== Audience ==
The Spokesman is a weekly newspaper that serves the city of Redmond and northern Deschutes County. It is published every Tuesday. It is a community newspaper that primarily covers local area news, sports, business, and events. Most of its advertising is local as well. The paper maintains an online presence through redmondspokesman.com, a website that has feature articles, local announcements, a current events calendar, and obituaries.

== History ==
The Spokesman is the oldest continuously operated business in the city of Redmond. It was first published on 14 July 1910. Its first publisher was Henry H. Palmer. He had previously published a newspaper in the neighboring town of Tumalo. He operated the newspaper with his wife Clara, who was also an experienced journalist.

In September 1911, the Palmers announced that The Spokesman had acquired a new press and paper cutter to improve newspaper printing and production. A typesetting machine was soon added. In January 1912, a new 1,200-pound linotype machine was installed to further improve the operation. However, on 26 February 1912 a fire started in a neighboring hardware store. It spread to adjacent buildings, burning down a grocery store, a bakery, a furniture store, and The Spokesman's office. Despite the fact that the loss exceeded their insurance coverage by $4,000, the Palmers were able to keep the newspaper going by using the presses at Redmond's other newspaper, The Oregon Hub and at The Bulletin in nearby Bend to print The Spokesman while new equipment was ordered.

After several months in temporary quarters, the paper moved into a new stone building on the old office site. When new equipment, including another modern linotype machine, was installed, the Palmers began printing The Spokesman in their own production facility again. The sign atop the new office building announcing the home of The Redmond Spokesman was 3 feet (0.91 m) high and 24 feet (7.3 m) long.

The Spokesman was Redmond's second paper. Its competition was The Oregon Hub, which was founded in 1909. A third community paper, the Redmond Enterprise, began publication in 1913. In 1914, the Palmers bought out the other two newspapers, leaving The Spokesman as Redmond's only newspaper.

The Palmers sold The Spokesman to M.W. Pettigrew in 1916. The change in ownership was announced in the 17 February edition of the paper that year. Pettigrew had been in the newspaper business in Kansas, but had moved to central Oregon to become a farmer. He was the publisher and editor of the paper until 1920, when he sold the business to Douglas Mullarky.

Mullarky was an experienced newspaperman, having been a reporter for The Hub and the founder of the short-live Redmond Enterprise. He published The Spokesman until 1922. He sold the newspaper to W.B. Russell and Edgar Bloom. Bloom and his wife bought Russell's share in the newspaper in 1925. The Blooms ran the business until November 1931, when they sold it to Joe and Mary Brown.

The Browns owned and published The Spokesman for the next 40 years, first as a couple and then Mary alone. Both of the Browns were graduates of the University of Oregon. Under their leadership the paper won the prestigious Hal E. Hoss memorial trophy three times in five years in the mid-1930s. Sponsored by the University of Oregon School of Journalism, the Hoss trophy honored the best weekly newspaper in the state of Oregon. After The Spokesman won it for the third time, the trophy was retired and presented to Joe Brown at a ceremony in Redmond.

In 1939, the Browns built a new facility to house their newspaper operation. The building was constructed on two adjoining lots on 6th Street between C and D streets in downtown Redmond. The new building was one-story, built in the streamline moderne style. It had a 50 feet (15 m) façade and was 60 feet (18 m) front to back. The building provided office space for the newspaper staff as well as housing the print shop.

In 1942, Mary Brown was elected president of the Oregon Press Conference while her husband was serving in the United States Navy. In 1955, she became sole owner of The Spokesman. She continued to run the business until 1971.

In June 1971, Mary Brown sold The Spokesman to Western Communications, Inc. The first publisher after Western Communications took ownership of the paper was Robert Moody. He stayed until 1975, when Carl Vertrees became publisher. Vertrees ran the paper for 26 years, winning the Oregon Newspaper Publishers Association's Carl C. Webb award for long-term public service in 1992. When Vertrees retired in February 2001, Gary Husman moved from general manager to publisher. In 2010, Husman was elected president of the Oregon Newspaper Publishers Association.

In 2012, Western Communications laid off 10% of its 400 workers, including staff The Spokesman. In 2019, The Spokesman was purchased by EO Media Group. Tim Trainor became the paper's editor in early 2022.

In October 2023, editorial staff at the Bend Bulletin and Redmond Spokesman announced plans to form a union. Two months later they voted 12-1 in favor of unionizing. In October 2024, EO Media Group was sold to Carpenter Media Group. John Carr was then named published.

== Publishers ==
- Henry H. Palmer and Clara L. Palmer, 1910–1916
- M. W. Pettigrew, 1916–1920
- Douglas Mullarky, 1920–1922
- J. Edger Bloom, 1922–1931
- Joe C. Brown and Mary Conn Brown, 1931–1955
- Mary Conn Brown, 1955–1971
- Robert Moody, 1971-1974
- Carl Vertrees, 1975–2001
- Gary Husman, 2001–2011
- Steven Hawes, 2011–2019
- Heidi Wright, 2019–2024
- John Carr, 2024–Present
