= The Observer (La Grande) =

Weekly newspaper published in La Grande, Oregon

The (La Grande) Observer
- A front page from 2019
- Type: Weekly newspaper
- Owner: EO Media Group
- Founder(s): Frederick Barlow Currey and George H. Currey
- Founded: 1896
- Headquarters: La Grande, Oregon
- Circulation: 2,662 Print; 453 Digital (as of 2023)
- OCLC number: 30722076
- Website: lagrandeobserver.com

The Observer, established in 1896, is a newspaper that serves Union and Wallowa counties in the U.S. state of Oregon. Its headquarters are in La Grande, the seat of Union County. The Observer circulates Monday, Wednesday and Friday afternoons. EO Media Group based in Salem, Oregon, publishes the newspaper.

== History ==
The Observer was founded in 1896 by brothers Frederick Barlow Currey and George H. Currey. Bruce Dennis bought it from them in 1910, and he sold the paper in 1925 to Frank B. Appleby. Peter R. Finlay purchased the paper from him in 1930, and died two years later of a sudden heart attack.

The La Grande Evening Observer was purchased by Frank Schiro and Fred Weybret on October 1, 1941. The Grande Ronde Valley Publishing Company was soon established. At the time of the sale, the paper had less than 1,700 subscribers, which grew to more than 3,600 by 1949. Schiro sold his ownership stake to Weybret on June 10, 1951. From then on the paper was managed by Weybret's son Fred. E. Weybret Jr. who became publisher. Weybret served in the California State Senate and died on January 31, 1955.

Weybret Jr. purchased the Paso Robles Press in 1956 and left Oregon to go manage his newly acquired paper. Ray C. Anderson was then made editor and publisher of the Observer. Weybret Jr. sold his Paso paper in February 1959 to Arthur C. Youngberg. That same month he sold the Observer to Robert W. Chandler and J. M. McClelland Jr. Weybret Jr. sold both his papers so he could buy the larger Lodi News-Sentinel.

In 2012, The Observer reduced its frequency from five days a week to three days a week, publishing issues on Mondays, Wednesdays and Fridays.

In June 2019, EO Media Group purchased The Observer and Baker City Herald after Western Communications Inc. filed for Chapter 11 bankruptcy protection in January. Lawyers for Western Communications told the bankruptcy court the plan was to sell the property and buildings, according to court records. Earlier in 2019, the motor failed on the 53-year-old press that had long printed The Observer and Baker City Herald and the two newspapers had to be printed on the East Oregonian’s press in Pendleton.

In June 2024, EO Media Group announced The Observer will cease print publication and go online-only. All print subscribers will instead receive the East Oregonian, published weekly and including news from The Observer's website. The company was purchased by Carpenter Media Group in October 2024.
