= Del Norte Triplicate =

Weekly newspaper published in Crescent City, California

- Type: Weekly newspaper
- Owner: Messenger Publishing Group
- Founder: J. E. Eldredge
- Publisher: Paul V. Scholl
- Founded: 1879
- Language: English
- Headquarters: P.O. Box 277, Crescent City, California, United States
- Sister newspapers: Curry Coastal Pilot
- ISSN: 2164-4470
- OCLC number: 759121143
- Website: triplicate.com

The Del Norte Triplicate is an American paid newspaper which serves the city of Crescent City and surrounding Del Norte County since 1879. It publishes weekly on Fridays.

== History ==
The Del Norte Daily Triplicate trace its roots back to 1879, starting as the Del Norte Record. The Record was established by J. E. Eldredge, edited by George Leon, and was the official paper of Del Norte County.

The name Del Norte Daily Triplicate comes from the names of three papers that united in 1912—the Coast Times, Del Norte Record, and Crescent City News. The term comes not from the term used for carbon copies, but from the original Latin triplicare, meaning "a third thing corresponding to others of the same kind." In 1913, W.H. McMaster left The Palladium in North Dakota and became editor and manager of the Del Norte Triplicate.

In 1922, John A. Juza and C.A. Potter purchased the Triplicate, and then updated the press to a linotype machine. At that time Juza owned the Gold Beach Reporter, which he soon sold after moving to Crescent City. In 1924, Juza purchased the Crescent City Courier, moved the plant to Brookings, Oregon, and launched the Interstate News. J.A. Juza and his wife Ella Mae Juza ran the Triplicate for 30 years.

In 1945, the Juzas sold the Triplicate to Frank Hilton and Dr. Malcom Hall. In 1952, Gordon G. Hadley, owner of the Arcata Union, purchased the Triplicate. In 1956, the paper broke with longstanding tradition of withholding names of arrested minors from print, making its policy to print them even for minor infractions.

In 1964, the Triplicate was completely destroyed in the wake of a tidal wave caused by a major Alaskan earthquake. Bill Soberanes of the Petaluma Argus-Courier reported that "The building in which this newspaper had been published (up until the tidal wave) was hit by the full blast of the tidal wave. Every copy of the newspaper printed the day before was washed away. The two linotypes were flooded over and rendered useless by the onrushing ocean waves."

The tidal wave, which did significant damage to Crescent City with a 21-foot wave traveling 500 miles per hour, killed 11 people in the city. The Triplicate's editor, James J. Yarbrough recalled, "There was eight feet of water in my office. I watched from up the street and saw the sparks fly when the water hit the Linotype machine. I saw a 900-pound roll of newsprint bobbing around like a spool."

After the destruction, the Triplicate moved its printing headquarters to Humboldt County. The move to Humboldt County called into question the paper's designation as a paper of record for Del Norte County. In 1965, Attorney General Thomas C. Lynch ruled that the paper could still be considered a general circulation paper for Del Norte County, despite its removed printing location.

In 1969, Hadley Newspapers, Inc. established by Gordon Hadley and his wife Monica Permeal Hadley, acquired and merged the Crescent City American into the Triplicate. In 1972, the couple sold their business to their son Craig L. Hadley and his wife Marilee Hadley, who soon bought the Garberville Redwood Record. In 1981, Gordon Hadley died. In 1984, Craig Hadley died.

Marilee Hadley, her mother-in-law Monica Hadley, and editor Jim Yarbrough published the Triplicate until 1986, when the company was sold. In 1988, Hadley Newspapers, Inc. sold the newspaper to Western Communications. The company owned the paper until 2019 when the Triplicate was acquired by Country Media, Inc. In 2025, Country Media closed the Triplicate because it wasn't financially sustainable. After closing, Dan Schmidt bought the paper and relaunched it. In 2026, Messenger Publishing Group, owned by Paul V. Scholl, acquired the paper. MPG had also acquired the paper's printer, Western Web Inc., earlier that year.

== Awards ==
In 2017, the Del Norte Triplicate won 2nd place in the Breaking News category in its division of the California's Better Newspapers Contest.
