= EO Media Group =

Media conglomerate, operating primarily in Oregon and Washington

- Company type: Private
- Industry: Media
- Headquarters: Salem
- Key people: Steve Forrester (President & CEO), Kathryn B. Brown (Vice President)
- Owner: Carpenter Media Group
- Number of employees: 185 (2024)
- Website: eomediagroup.com

The EO Media Group, formerly known as the East Oregonian Publishing Company, is a newspaper publishing company based in the U.S. state of Oregon. It publishes 17 newspapers in the state and in southwestern Washington.

== History ==
The company, which has been family-owned for four generations, was previously known as the East Oregonian Publishing Company. It changed its name to EO Media Group in January 2013.

It is owned by the Aldrich and Forrester families, members of which previously owned several newspapers (including the East Oregonian and The Daily Astorian) independently. The connection between the East Oregonian and The Daily Astorian dates to 1909, when several East Oregonian staffers bought the Astoria Budget, which was later merged with the Astorian. In 1973, the father and son (J. W. Forrester, Jr. and Michael A. Forrester) who had been publishing the East Oregonian and the Daily Astorian switched positions.

The company acquired the Blue Mountain Eagle in 1979, the Chinook Observer in 1988, the Capital Press in 1990, Wallowa County Chieftain in 2000, the North Coast Citizen in 2007 and The Hermiston Herald in 2008. The North Coast Citizen was sold to Country Media, Inc. in 2011. A year later EO Media purchased Oregon Coast TODAY in Lincoln City. The following year Country Media sold the Seaside Signal, Cannon Beach Gazette and Coast River Business Journal to EO Media Group in 2013.

In 2014, the EO Media Group partnered with the Pamplin Media Group, which publishes the Portland Tribune and 24 other weekly and monthly publications in Oregon, to form the Oregon Capital Bureau and publish the Oregon Capital Insider newsletter. The partnership came as the number of reporters assigned to state capital bureaus nationwide was on the decline. In 2018, the newly-launched Salem Reporter joined the bureau, and its publisher, Les Zaitz, was assigned to lead its three reporters. As of spring 2020, the Salem Reporter and Zaitz are no longer part of the Oregon Capital Bureau.

The Aldrich-Forrester-Bedford-Brown family, which owns the EO Media Group, was covered in the 2018 book Grit and Ink: An Oregon Family's Adventures in Newspapering, 1908–2018 by William F. Willingham. The book was published by the EO Media Group; but according to the author, it isn't an "authorized biography," and he had "wide open" ground rules. The book was to be distributed by the Oregon State University Press.

In May 2019, EO Media Group sold the Cannon Beach Gazette to Country Media. In July that same year, EO Media Group acquired the Baker City Herald, The Observer (La Grande), The Bulletin (Bend) and The Redmond Spokesman from Western Communications.

In 2020, EO Media Group closed its press in Pendleton installed in 2013 and sold it to the Walla Walla Union-Bulletin, who will print all of the company's papers moving forward. That same year Oregon Coast TODAY was sold to Patrick Alexander, who worked as the publication's editor and publisher. In 2023, EO Media Group founded the Rogue Valley Times following the closure of the Mail Tribune. That same year the company sold its Pendleton office building which it had owned since 1956.

In June 2024, EO Media Group announced cutbacks to staff and print frequency. Twenty-eight employees, or 15% of total staff, were laid off and another 19 will have their hours reduced. The Bend Bulletin, East Oregonian and The Rogue Valley Times each eliminated a print day. Five newspapers suspended print entirely and went online-only: The La Grande Observer, Blue Mountain Eagle, Hermiston Herald, Wallowa County Chieftain and the Baker City Herald. In October 2024, EO Media Group was sold to Carpenter Media Group.

== Awards ==
The group won a top regional award for its "Fate of Our Forests" series from the Society of Professional Journalists in 2012, in a regional group including papers under 25,000 circulation from Montana to Alaska. The same series, which ran in 2011, had previously won the Dolly Connelly Award for Excellence in Environmental Reporting from the Pacific Northwest Newspaper Association.

== Newspapers ==
Newspapers owned by EO Media Group
State	City	Newspaper
Oregon	Astoria	The Astorian
Oregon	Baker City	Baker City Herald
Oregon	John Day	Blue Mountain Eagle
Oregon	Bend	The Bulletin (Bend)
Oregon	Salem	Capital Press
Washington (state)	Long Beach	Chinook Observer
Washington	Long Beach	Coast River Business Journal
Oregon	Pendleton	East Oregonian
Oregon	Hermiston	Hermiston Herald
Oregon	La Grande	The Observer
Oregon	Seaside	Seaside Signal
Oregon	Astoria	Our Coast Magazine
Oregon	Redmond	Redmond Spokesman
Oregon	Enterprise	Wallowa County Chieftain
Oregon	Medford	Rogue Valley Times
