= George Stanley Turnbull =

English-American scholar and educator

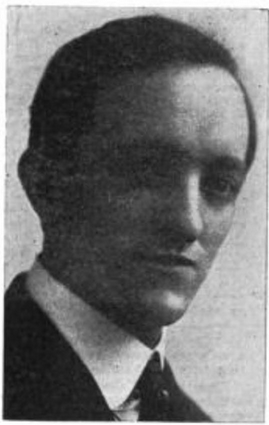
- Born: December 5, 1882; Newcastle upon Tyne, England
- Died: February 9, 1977 (aged 94); Salem, Oregon
- Spouse: Mary Lou Burton
- Children: Sarah Turnbull; George S. Turnbull Jr.

George Stanley Turnbull (December 5, 1882 – February 9, 1977) was an English-American scholar and educator. He began a career of newspaper work in 1894 and helped found the University of Oregon School of Journalism in 1917, later serving as acting dean and, from 1944 to 1948, as dean. He founded and edited Oregon Exchanges, a newspaper for Oregon's "newspaper folk," which was at least initially produced by students at the School of Journalism.

Turnbull published five books, including the 1939 History of Oregon Newspapers, which was identified in the Eugene Register-Guard in 1950 as the "most authentic source on newspapering in the state." He presented at the 15th annual Oregon State Editorial Association conference, which was described at the time as the most successful conference to date. The work has been cited as an authority in numerous sources.

== Early life ==
George Stanley Turnbull was born on Dec. 5, 1882, in Newcastle upon Tyne, England. He was named after his father, who died from wounds he received as a British infantryman serving in Egypt. At 10, Turnbull immigrated to the United States with his paternal grandparents in 1892. They lived in Marysville, Washington and his first job was at the Marysville Globe as a type-setter. He graduated high school in 1902 and was hired as a proofreader and telegraph editor for the Bellingham Reveille. After a couple of years he was promoted to managing editor.

== Career ==
Turnbull graduated from the University of Washington in 1904. On Dec. 26, 1905, he was hired as a reporter for the Seattle Post-Intelligencer and eventually was promoted to assistant city editor. After a decade, he went to work for The Seattle Times in 1916.

In 1917, Turnbull came to teach at the University of Oregon. In 1932, he earned a Master of Arts from the University of Washington. In 1939, he published History of Oregon Newspapers, which retells 92 years of Oregon's journalism history. Turnbull worked on the book for about 15 years.

In 1944, Turnbull became acting dean of the University of Oregon School of Journalism following the death of Eric W. Allen. He retired as dean in 1948. Upon his retirement from UO, one person said "Nobody really knows anything about journalism, but insofar as it can be taught at all, George teaches it."

Turnbull went on to teach at Stanford University and the University of Nebraska–Lincoln. He later returned to newspaper work at The Oregonian and the Albany Democrat-Herald before coming back to the University of Oregon in 1955 to do research on the history of journalism. He was active with the school's journalism program through the '70s. In 1971, Turnbull received the UO Distinguished Service Award.

== Bibliography ==
- History of Oregon Newspapers (1939)
- An Oregon Editor's Battle for Freedom of the Press (1952)
- An Oregon Crusader (1955) - biography on George Putnam
- Governors of Oregon (1959)
- Journalists in the Making, A History of the School of Journalism at the University of Oregon (1965)

== Personal life ==
Turnbull married Mary Lou Burton in 1927 and had two kids together named Sarah and George Jr.

== Death and legacy ==
Turnbull died on Feb. 9, 1977 at a nursing home in Salem, Oregon. He was 94. His obituary in The Oregonian described him as a "wispy, shy man" who trained thousands of aspiring journalists to go on to careers in writing, editing and politics. His obit in the Oregon Journal read: "Newspaper readers who may never have heard the name George Turnbull will long remain indebted to him for his profound contribution to Oregon journalism.

In 1998, the University of Oregon School of Journalism inducted Turnbull into its Hall of Achievement. The George S. Turnbull Center, UO's journalism campus in Portland, was named after him.
