= Baker City Herald =

Weekly newspaper published in Baker City, Oregon

- Type: Tri-weekly newspaper
- Owner: Carpenter Media Group
- Editor: Jayson Jacoby
- Founded: May 11, 1870
- Headquarters: 1915 1st Street, Baker City, Oregon 97814 United States
- Circulation: 1,948 Print; 329 Digital (as of 2023)
- Website: bakercityherald.com

The Baker City Herald is a tri-weekly paper published in Baker City, Oregon, United States, since 1870. It is published on Mondays, Wednesdays and Fridays and is owned by Carpenter Media Group.

== History ==
The Herald was established as the Bedrock-Democrat on May 11, 1870. Its founders were Milton H. Abbott, who had previously launched the Oregon Herald, and Lewis Linn McArthur. In 1887, Ira Bowen and George Small purchased the newspaper for $2,500. Bowen and Small published the Daily Democrat and ran the Bedrock Democrat as a weekly edition. Their partnership ended in 1919.

In 1929, the Bedrock-Democrat was purchased by Lucien P. Arant and Bernard Mainwaring. The new owners merged it with the city's other daily paper, the Morning Herald, to become the Baker Democrat-Herald. Arant published the paper for 32 years until selling it in 1957 to a group of Californians headed by Lee C. Bollinger. A decade later Bollinger's ownership group sold it to the owners of the La Grande Observer, including Robert W. Chandler of Western Communications.

When the city's name was changed from Baker back to Baker City in 1990, the paper was renamed to Baker City Herald. The Herald went from being published five days a week to three on June 1, 2009. In 2019, EO Media Group acquired the Baker City Herald from Western Communications. In June 2024, EO Media Group announced the Baker City Herald will cease print publication and go online-only. All print subscribers will instead receive the East Oregonian, published weekly and including news from Baker City Herald's website. The company was purchased by Carpenter Media Group in October 2024.
