= Curry Coastal Pilot =

Weekly Newspaper published in Brookings, Oregon

- Type: Weekly newspaper
- Owner: Country Media, Inc.
- Publisher: Joe Warren
- Founded: 1946
- Language: English
- Headquarters: P.O. Box 670, Salem OR 97308
- OCLC number: 30721815
- Website: currypilot.com

The Curry Coastal Pilot is a weekly newspaper published in Brookings, Oregon, United States, since 1946. It is published on Wednesdays by Country Media, Inc.

== History ==
The paper originated as the Dayton Tribune of Dayton around 1911 before relocating to Brookings decades later. The first Tribune editor was D. C. Eshmun. In the paper's first year of existence, Eshmun was beaten with an umbrella by Mrs. J. J. Jones after he penned an article implying the type of sewing machine her husband sold was low quality. Eshmun wrote a retraction. He then quit and was replaced Fred T. Mellinger.

Mellinger was called up for the Mexican Border War and bought the paper back in 1917 from H. D. Skinner. He then quit and left town in 1923. Local businessmen and the Telephone Register of McMinnville tried to keep the paper alive but it shuttered after a month. A year later A. N. Merrill of Bay City moved his Bay City Chronicle plant to Dayton and restarted the Tribune.

The paper was then purchased by Charles W. Van Wormer in 1927, E. B Stolle and C. M. Sutton in 1931, Byron Hughes in 1934, J. R. Todd in 1935 and Milo Taylor in 1938. After 11 months Taylor sold the Tribune to John M. Biggs Jr. Ownership reverted back to Taylor after several months who then sold it again in 1940 to Dewy Akers. A few years later Akers discontinued the paper and relocated his printing plant to Brookings to launch the Brookings Harbor-Pilot on March 7, 1946. Akers was killed in a plane crash in 1952 and his widow sold the paper two years later to Joe Murphy and Bud Pisarek.The co-publishers became known by locals as "The Boys" and doubled the circulation within a few years.

In 1958, Vern Shomshak bought the paper, and sold it in 1961 to John Jenkins, former advertising manager of the Grants Pass Daily Courier. About a year later Jenkins sold the Harbor-Pilot to Richard W. and Polly W. Keusink. The couple owned the paper for 19 years, increased circulation from 2,000 to 7,000 and changed its name in July 1978 to the Curry Coastal Pilot. They sold it in 1981 to Western Communications of Bend. The company went bankrupt and sold the paper to Country Media of Salem in July 2019.
