= Oregon Exchanges =

Oregon Exchanges was an American newspaper published by the University of Oregon School of Journalism and Communications (SOJC) in the early 20th century. It initially described itself as a "Newspaper for Newspaper Men"; by 1930, it had adopted the gender-neutral slogan "For the Newspaper Folk of the State of Oregon." Its first issue was published in June 1917, the year after the school's founding. By the October issue, it was announced that students in the editing class would edit the publication. By 1920, students were producing the newspaper as part of their coursework in a course titled "Practical Editing." The paper was reportedly greeted with much praise at a 1922 convention of Sigma Delta Chi, a national journalism society.

Professor George Stanley Turnbull served as editor in 1923, and that year it was named the official organ of the Oregon State Editorial Association. In 1924, it published the second Oregon newspaper directory, which was prepared by the SOJC. In 1929 Editor & Publisher described it as the "organ of the Oregon Press Association." Oregon Exchanges was discontinued as part of a cost-cutting campaign resulting from the Great Depression in 1932. It was succeeded a few months later by Oregon Publisher, which was produced by the Oregon Newspaper Publishers Association, an organization with close ties to the SOJC.
