= East Oregonian =

Weekly newspaper published in Pendleton, Oregon

- Type: Daily newspaper
- Format: Broadsheet
- Owner: EO Media Group
- Founder: M.P. Bull
- Managing editor: Phil Wright
- Founded: 1875
- Language: English
- Headquarters: 211 S. E. Byers Ave. Pendleton, OR 97801
- Circulation: 4,293 Print; 997 Digital (as of 2023)
- Website: eastoregonian.com

The East Oregonian is a weekly newspaper published in Pendleton, Oregon, United States and covering Umatilla and Morrow counties. EO is owned by EO Media Group and is the newspaper of record for Umatilla County.

== History ==
M.P. Bull first published the East Oregonian on Oct. 16, 1875. It was a weekly Democratic newspaper serving Pendleton, Oregon. At that time the population was around 250. Bull used a Washington hand press to print the first issue. He previously lived in Portland and decided to name his paper in reference to The Oregonian. This caused some people to link the two, although they're unrelated. Bull, a member of the Oregon Bar, was in poor health and sold the paper to lawyer J. H. Turner, who bought it out of concern of the paper falling into Republican hands. Turner and six other men formed the East Oregonian Publishing Co. and purchased the publication on Oct. 9, 1877. Turner brought on B. B. Bishop and the two sold the paper in 1880, they sold to Lewis Berkeley Cox.

In 1881, C. S. "Sam" Jackson purchased a quarter interest in the Eastern Oregonian from Cox, and sold it back later that year for $250 more than he paid. On Jan. 13, 1882, Jackson bought the paper for $3,500. He was 21 at the time, and with little money, persuaded J. A. Guyer to loan him the funds for the sale. Guyer was a silent partner who Jackson soon bought out. Author George Stanley Turnbull described Jackson as "a character which has been one of the most influential in the history of Oregon journalism." Jackson was a fighting editor in the literal sense. He got into fist fights in the streets to defend his opinions. After one brawl with a reader, Jackson wrote: "A man who is afraid of bodily injury or personal attacks is not a newspaperman or capable of becoming one."

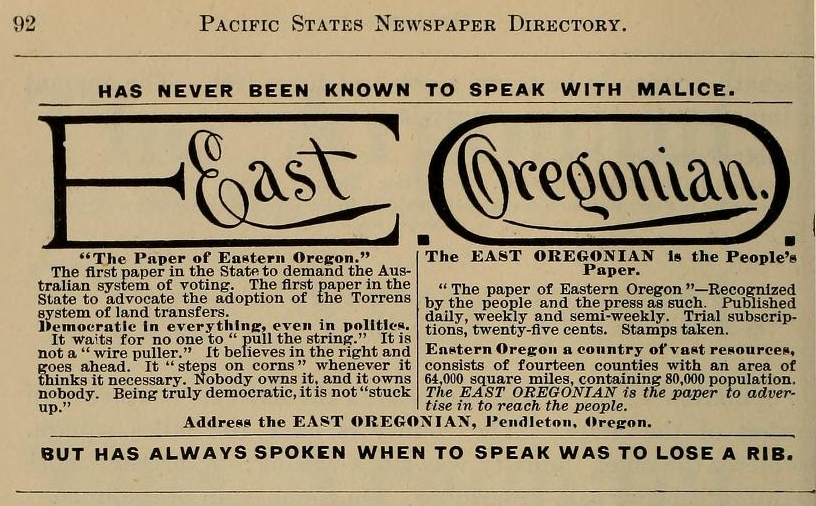
An 1894 advertisement for the East Oregonian in a national newspaper directory.

Jackson increased print days from once to twice a week starting Feb. 3, 1882. The East Oregonian expanded from semi-weekly to daily, except Sunday, on March 1, 1888. Part of the announcement titled "He We Are" read "Unlike our new neighbor, the Daily East Oregonian is not started for campaign purposes. It is started as a NEWSPAPER and has come to stay, if possible." At this time EO was "a powerful voice in the region" and Jackson went on to own and be publisher of the Oregon Journal in Portland. He sold his remaining interests in EO in 1913.

Edwin B. Aldrich started work the paper in 1904, and then became a stockholder in 1908 when he and Lee D. Drake bought Fred Lockley's 25% of the paper. Aldrich edited the paper until his death in 1951. His son-in-law J.W. "Bud" Forrester went on to run the paper. Around that time the East Oregonian opened a bureau office in Hermiston. In 1956, the paper purchased a Goss Suburban press. It was the first daily paper west of St. Louis to use an offset web press. In 2000, EO added a Sunday edition.

In June 2024, EO Media Group announced the East Oregonian will go from two to one print edition day each week. Moving forward, EO will serve as a regional newspaper for all of northeastern Oregon and publish news from five newspaper that went online-only: The La Grande Observer, Blue Mountain Eagle, Hermiston Herald, Wallowa County Chieftain and Baker City Herald. The company was purchased by Carpenter Media Group in October 2024.
