= The Astorian =

Daily newspaper published in Astoria, Oregon

- Front page from August 10, 2016
- Type: Daily newspaper
- Format: Broadsheet
- Owner: EO Media Group
- Founder: DeWitt Clinton Ireland
- Publisher: Kari Borgen
- Editor: Derrick DePledge
- Founded: July 1, 1873; 153 years ago
- Language: English
- Headquarters: 949 Exchange St. Astoria, OR 97103
- Circulation: 4,883 Print; 1,134 Digital (as of 2023)
- ISSN: 0739-5078
- Website: dailyastorian.com

The Astorian, formerly known as The Daily Astorian, is a newspaper, published in Astoria, Oregon, United States, established in 1873, and in publication continuously since then. The paper serves the Astoria, Warrenton, Seaside area, the Long Beach Peninsula, and surrounding areas. The newspaper is published three times each week and is owned by EO Media Group.

== History ==
DeWitt Clinton "D.C." Ireland first published the Tri-Weekly Astorian on July 1, 1873. He was a newspaperman born back east who had previously worked at The Oregonian before launching the Oregon City Enterprise, followed by the Astorian several years later. Clinton founded the paper at the request of a group of Astorian businessmen, and the first edition was a five-column, four-page paper. The print schedule was cut back from three to once a week after a few years due to the Panic of 1873.

Financial conditions improved and the first issue of The Daily Astorian, printed five days a week, was published on May 1, 1876. The paper installed a steam engine to operate its press in January 1877. Ireland went on to be elected the town's mayor twice and served as James A. Garfield's private secretary at the 1880 Republican National Convention. In 1881, Ireland sold the paper to John F. Halloran for $10,000 in gold. In August 1890, Halloran sold the Astorian to P. W. Parker.

Around 1892, Samuel Elmore became the paper's majority stock owner. Elmore was a wealthy business man who owned steamship lines and canneries. He often ran the paper at a loss. In February 1893, Parker bought out Elmore, becoming the paper's sole proprietor. He then retired that August after being connected to the paper for a dozen years and Elmore resumed control. In 1899, the paper was purchased by the Astorian Publishing Company, formed by John Adams, John T. Lighter and George Gray. In 1902, P. M. Maher assumed control of the paper from Elmore.

In August 1903, Elmore sold the Morning Astorian to Walter Lyon and Otis Patterson. Lyon retired that October. Patterson's The Daily Morning Astorian merged with Robert Gibson's Daily Evening News in December 1903. The newly formed Franklin Printing Company published a combined evening edition under both mastheads, which proved unpopular. By the month's end Elmore resumed control of the Astorian, who then transferred ownership to John S. Dellinger. Dellinger previously ran the Bay City Tribune for two years before moving to Astoria to publish several papers in the area at various times including the Astoria Daily News, Nehalem Herald and Port Oregon Tribune of Warrenton.

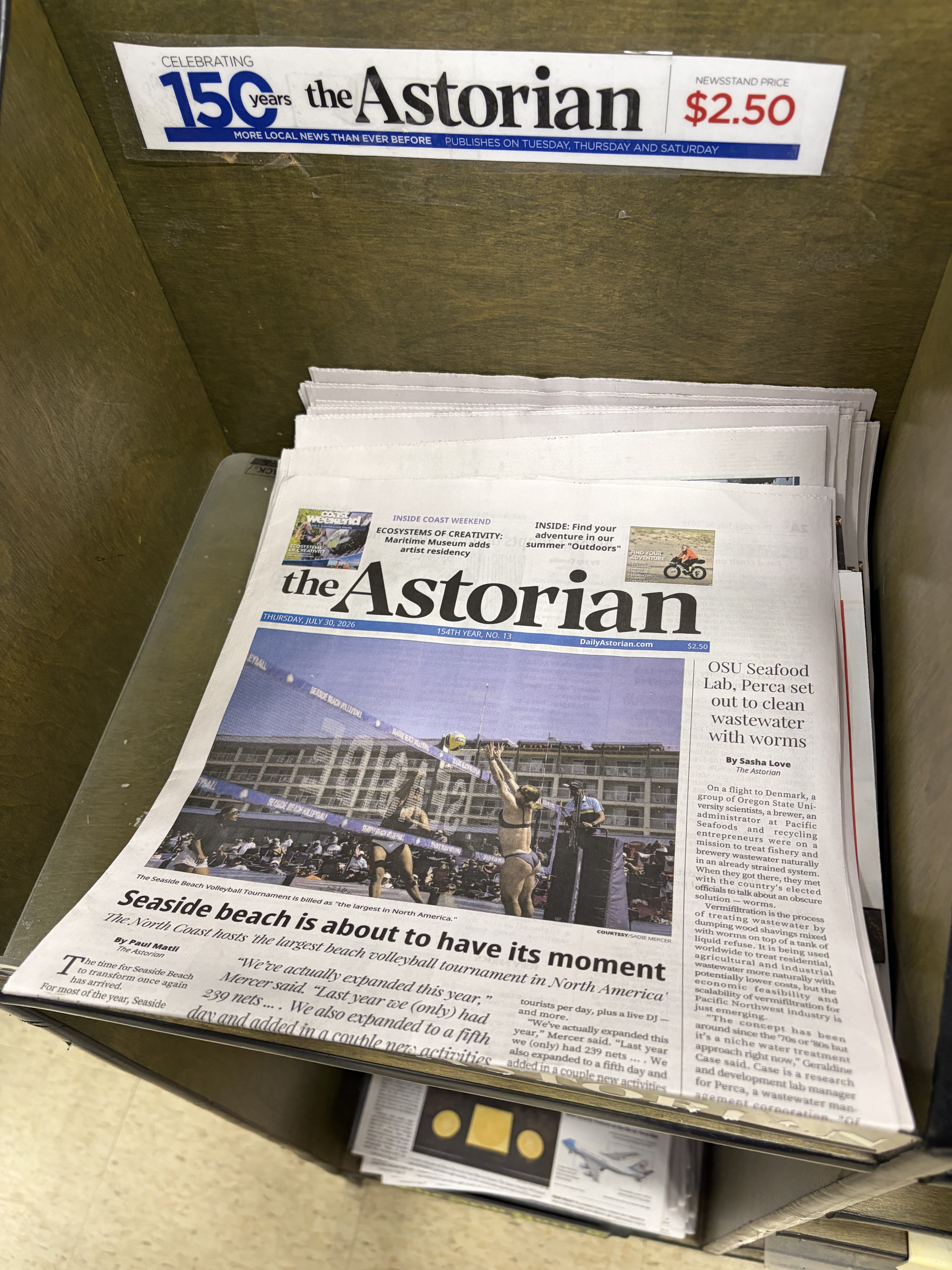
A copy of the Thursday, July 30, 2026 edition of The Astorian seen for sale at a Safeway in Seaside, Oregon.

The paper's office was destroyed in the 1922 Astoria, Oregon fire. Dellinger published Astorian for nearly three decades until his death in 1930. At that time the paper was sold to the owners of the Astoria Budget, who merged the two papers to form the Evening Astorian-Budget. Part of the ownership group was E. B. Aldrich, owner the East Oregonian. The name was changed to The Daily Astorian starting at the beginning of 1961.

One of the paper's owners was E. B. Aldrich, an editor at the East Oregonian. His family business became the East Oregonian Publishing Company, which merged with the Astorian-Budget Publishing Company in 1973. The company's name was later changed to EO Media Group. In February 2010, a new printing press was brought into use for the paper in Astoria, replacing one that had lasted since 1970. The new press was secondhand from the Chicago Sun-Times, but was only five years old when acquired by the Daily Astorian.

In 2019, the paper dropped the word Daily from its name and decreased its print schedule from five to three days a week. In October 2024, EO Media Group was purchased by Carpenter Media Group. A month later the newspaper's building, which it had owned since 1970, was put up for sale. The print and packaging operations were moved to Carpenter's facility in Lakewood, Washington. In 2026, the paper's former building was sold for $1.1 million to a nonprofit supporting domestic violence survivors.

== In popular culture ==
In the 2005 film The Ring Two, The Daily Astorian was the workplace of fictional investigative journalist Rachel Keller. In the film, the newspaper headquarters is shown located at Astoria 12th and Marine Dr.
