= Oregon Newspaper Publishers Association =

American trade association

- Established: 1887
- Type: Nonprofit
- Purpose: Trade association of newspapers
- Headquarters: Lake Oswego, Oregon
- Website: www.orenews.com

The Oregon Newspaper Publishers Association is a trade association for all paid-circulation daily, weekly, and multi-weekly newspapers in the U.S. state of Oregon. It represents and promotes newspapers, and encourages excellence in reporting and coverage with an annual series of awards.

== History ==
The organization was established as the Oregon Press Association in 1887. It was renamed the Oregon State Editorial Association in 1909, and adopted its current name in 1936. It has about 80 member newspapers plus additional associate member and collegiate member newspapers as of 2014.

In 2025, ONPA expanded its statewide newspaper contest to include newspapers in Idaho and Washington state, and the competition's name was changed to the Pacific NW News Publishing Contest.

== Mission ==
Besides providing advertising distribution, it also provides aggregation of public notices and other information from its member newspapers, including state and city calls for bids, changes in municipal code, foreclosures, estate claims, forfeited property, probate, summons, and similar information.

It also may sponsor and organize political debates, such as the 2014 governor candidates' debate.

== See also ==
- Journalism in Oregon
- Oregon Exchanges
