= McKenna (name) =

McKenna is an Irish surname. It derives from the Gaelic name Cináed (Anglicized as Kenneth), meaning "born of fire". It is the Anglicized form of the Gaelic Mac Cionaodha meaning "son of Cionnaith", or of the Scottish surname, from Galloway, "MacCionaodha".

The historical lineage of the McKennas lies in the Barony of Truagh in the north of County Monaghan in the south of Ulster in Ireland, where they were "The Lords of Truagh". In Munster Irish, McKenna is considered to come from Mag Cineáit. The Cionnath, Cionaoith, Cionaddha forms are considered there to be sources of names like Kenny, Kenney, and Kennedy. A similar Irish surname is Ó Cionaodha, also spelt as Ó Cionnaith.

The name is also sometimes used as a given name. Notable people with this name include:

== Surname ==
- Alan McKenna (disambiguation), several persons
- Alex McKenna (born 1984), American actress
- Andrew McKenna, American political organizer
- Andrew J. McKenna (1929–2023), American businessman
- Antoinette McKenna, Irish musician
- Barney McKenna (1939–2012), Irish musician
- Bernard McKenna (writer) (born 1944), Scottish television writer and producer
- Bernard J. McKenna (1842–1903), American politician
- Brian McKenna (1945–2023), Canadian filmmaker
- Buck McKenna, Canadian football coach
- Catherine McKenna (born 1971), Canadian politician
- Charlene McKenna (born 1984), Irish actress
- Charles F. McKenna (1844–1922), American judge
- Chris McKenna (disambiguation), several persons
- Christina McKenna, Irish writer
- Christine McKenna (born 1951), British actress
- Clodagh McKenna, Irish Chef
- Conor McKenna (born 1996), Australian footballer
- Conor McKenna, Irish comedian
- David McKenna (disambiguation), several persons
- Declan McKenna (born 1998), English singer, songwriter and musician
- Dennis McKenna (born 1950), American ethnopharmacologist
- Donald McKenna (disambiguation), several persons
- Eugene McKenna, Northern Irish Gaelic footballer and manager
- Francine McKenna, American journalist, blogger, and columnist
- Francis I. McKenna (1859–1914), American architect, and real estate and land developer
- Frank McKenna (born 1948), Canadian businessman, politician, and diplomat
- Gail McKenna (born 1968), English model, actress, and presenter
- Gavin McKenna (born 2007), Canadian ice hockey player
- Gerry McKenna (born 1953), Northern Irish biologist and academic
- Guy McKenna (born 1969), Australian football player and coach
- Jimmy McKenna (born 1953), Scottish actor
- Joe McKenna (born 1951), Irish hurler
- John McKenna (disambiguation), several persons
- Joseph McKenna (1843–1926), American politician and judge
- Judith McKenna (born 1966/1967), British businesswoman
- Juliet E. McKenna (born 1965), British author
- Ken McKenna (born 1960), English footballer and manager
- Kevin McKenna (disambiguation), several persons
- Kieran McKenna (born 1986), Northern Irish football manager
- Kit McKenna (1873–1941), American baseball player
- Kristine McKenna, American journalist, critic and art curator
- Lawrence M. McKenna (1933–2023), American judge
- Lesley McKenna (born 1974), British snowboarder
- Lori McKenna (born 1968), American folk singer and songwriter
- Malcolm McKenna (1930–2008), American palaeontologist
- Mark McKenna, Irish actor
- Matt McKenna (born 1975), American bassist
- Megan McKenna (born 1992), English television personality
- Mia McKenna-Bruce (born 1997), English actress
- Michael McKenna (disambiguation), several person
- Molly McKenna (born 2006), British trampoline gymnast
- Niall McKenna (born 1977), Irish philanthropist for all things Gaelic football
- Nick McKenna (1895–1974), Australian politician
- Patricia McKenna (born 1957), Irish politician
- Patrick McKenna (born 1960), Canadian actor
- Paul McKenna (born 1963), British hypnotist
- Peter McKenna (Australian footballer) (born 1946), Australian footballer
- Peter McKenna (English footballer) (1901–1964), English footballer
- Reginald McKenna (1863–1943), British politician
- Richard McKenna (1913–1964), American writer
- Rob McKenna (born 1962), American politician
- Rollie McKenna, American photographer
- Rory McKenna (born 1993), New Zealand singer
- Robert McKenna (1927–2015), American Catholic bishop and exorcist
- Ryan McKenna (politician) (born 1973), American politician
- Ryan McKenna (baseball) (born 1997), American baseball player
- Sabrina McKenna (born 1957), American judge
- Sarah McKenna (born 1989), English rugby player
- Scott McKenna, Scottish footballer
- Sean McKenna (footballer) (born 1987), Scottish footballer
- Sean McKenna (ice hockey) (born 1962), Canadian ice hockey player
- Seana McKenna (born 1956), Canadian stage actor
- Siobhán McKenna (1923–1986), Irish actress
- Stephen McKenna (disambiguation), several persons
- Terence McKenna (1946–2000), American philosopher
- Thomas Patrick McKenna (1929–2011), Irish actor
- Virginia McKenna (born 1931), British actress and writer
- William McKenna (politician) (born 1946), American politician
- William McKenna (actor), Australian actor
- Willie McKenna (1889–1958), Scottish footballer

== Given name ==
- Makenna Cowgill (born 1998), American former child actress
- Mckenna Grace (born 2006), American actress
- McKenna Harris, American filmmaker
- Makenna Webster (born 2002), American ice hockey player
- McKenna Woliczko (born 2008), American basketball player
- Makenna Kelly (born 2005), American social media influencer

== Fictional characters ==
- Elise McKenna, portrayed by Jane Seymore in Somewhere in Time
- Jonathon McKenna, from the New Zealand soap opera Shortland Street
- Rachel McKenna, from the New Zealand soap opera Shortland Street
- Ginger McKenna, portrayed by Sharon Stone in the 1995 film Casino
- Quinn McKenna, portrayed by Boyd Holbrook in the 2018 film The Predator
- McKenna Brooks, American Girl character

== See also ==
- McKenna (disambiguation)
- MacKenna (disambiguation)
- Kenna (disambiguation)
