= Jobes Milling Company =

Flour mill in Portland, Oregon

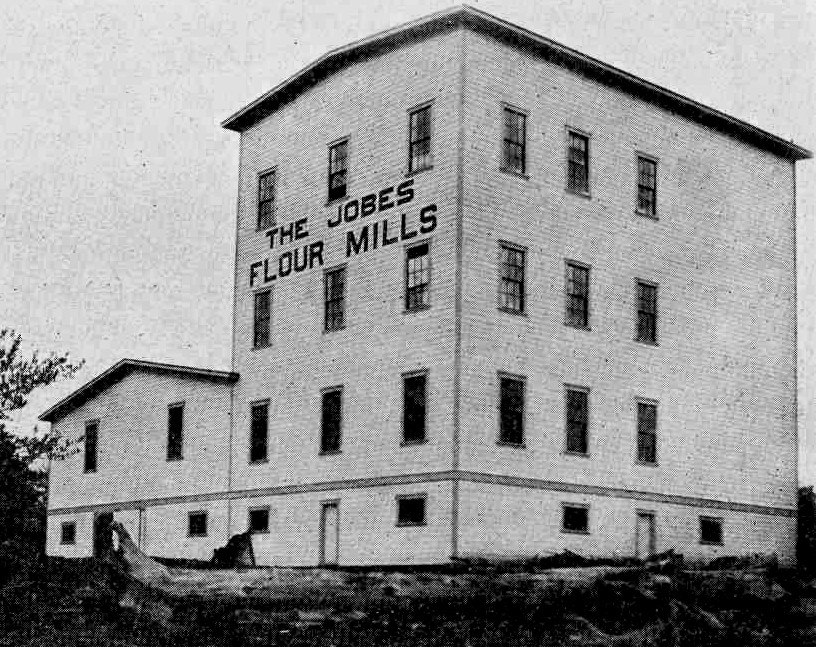
- Company type: flour mill
- Industry: manufacturing
- Predecessor: Rose City Flour Mill
- Founded: St. Johns, Oregon, United States 1904
- Founder: William Van Zant Jobes
- Defunct: 1930
- Fate: sold 1918; demolished 1930
- Headquarters: St. Johns, Oregon (1904–15); Portland, Oregon (1915–30)
- Key people: Allan R. and William Haskell Jobes
- Owner: William Van Zant Jobes (1904–07); Allan R. and William Haskell Jobes (1907–11); Allan R. Jobes (1911–18); Rose City Flour Mill (1918–30)
- Parent: Rose City Flour Mill (1918–30)

Jobes Milling Company was a flour mill based in the St. Johns neighborhood of Portland, Oregon. It was constructed in 1904 by William Van Zant Jobes who relocated to St. Johns from Spokane, Washington. He died in 1907 and his sons took over the mill. In 1910, William Haskell Jobes died leaving sole ownership to his brother Allan R. Jobes. He sold the mill in 1918 and died three years later. The Rose City Flour Mill operated the mill as a subsidiary until the building was demolished in 1930.

== History ==
William Van Zant Jobes of Rockford, Illinois erected the Jobes Milling Company in St. Johns, Oregon in 1904 after leaving his son's flour mill in Spokane, Washington. At its inception, the mill could produce 400 barrels of flour a day. During a citywide fire in 1905, the mill was spared damage. Jobes ran for mayor of St. Johns in 1905, but lost to W. H. King. That same year he was discovered by a woman from Washington who said he failed to pay back a loan she made out to him in Spokane. According to a city attorney, Jobes used the loan to purchase lumber for a new mill in Spokane but sold it when he decided to relocate to St. Johns, Oregon. Jobes died in his office at the mill on July 9, 1907.

Following his death his sons, Allan R. and William Haskell Jobes took over the ownership of the mill. They sued the City of St. Johns in 1910 saying that a planned sewer would runoff into their property. A judge allowed the city to continue with the construction. William Haskell Jobes died of heart disease in 1911, leaving his brother Allan R. Jobes as the sole owner. By 1917 the mill was producing 500 barrels of flour per day. In 1918 the mill was purchased by the Rose City Flour Mill, who used it as a subsidiary. The new owners planned to double the production of barrels per day. Allan R. Jobes died in 1920. The flour mill was demolished in 1930 and a lumber mill was constructed in its place.

== See also ==
- Portland Woolen Mills
- St. Johns City Hall
- St. Johns Twin Cinema
