= William McKenna =

William McKenna may refer to:

- Willie McKenna (1889–1958), Scottish footballer for Queen's Park, Falkirk, Port Glasgow Athletic, Morton and Clydebank
- Bill McKenna (1933–2012), American football end in 1955 Philadelphia Eagles season
- William McKenna (politician) (born 1946), American Democratic legislator from Missouri
- William McKenna (actor), Australian actor
