= Senator McKenna =

Senator McKenna may refer to:

- Dale McKenna (1937–2009), Wisconsin State Senate
- Edward B. McKenna (1883–1942), Michigan State Senate
- Ryan McKenna (politician) (born 1973), Missouri State Senate
- William McKenna (politician) (born 1946), Missouri State Senate

== See also ==
- John T. McKennan (1918–2011), New York State Senate
