= Mid-county Memo =

- Type: Monthly newspaper
- Owner(s): Tim Curran
- Founder(s): Marsha and Tom Pry
- Founded: May 1985
- Language: English
- Ceased publication: January 2019
- Headquarters: 3510 N.E. 134th Ave., Portland, Oregon
- Website: midcountymemo.com

The Mid-county Memo was a monthly newspaper serving the Gateway and Parkrose neighborhoods of east Portland in the U.S. state of Oregon. It was published from May 1985 to January 2019. The Oregonian frequently picked up stories from the Memo, and Willamette Week credited the Memo's coverage on several occasions. Other publications interviewed its publisher Tim Curran for his views on East Portland. Starting around 2011, the Memo was part of The Oregonian's "Oregonian News Network," The network included news outlets The Oregonian identified as providing "daily original reporting that brings new information to the public" and cover "hyperlocal or niche focused news and information."

== History ==
In May 1985, Marsha and Tom Pry launched the Mid-county Memo. At the time their company Sellwood-Moreland Bee, Co. was publishing three other community newspapers in Portland, Oregon: the Sellwood Bee, St. Johns Review and Hollywood Star. The Memo distributed 20,000 free copies each month to households and businesses in the 97220 and 97230 zip code areas. The couple sold the Memo in 1991 to Tim Curran, the paper's former advertising manager, for $15,000. At that time the paper had a circulation of 15,000. The Oregonian interviewed publisher Curran in 2012 on local city politics and history. Curran traced the term "East Portland" to the mid-1980s, when Portland annexed most of the unincorporated area between itself and Gresham, which had previously been known as the "mid-county." In January 2019, Curran announced the Mid-county Memo will cease. In total, the publication was around for 34 years and published 404 issues.
