= McKennan =

McKennan is a surname of Irish origin. It may refer to:

- John T. McKennan (1918–2011), New York politician
- Peter McKennan (1918–1991), Scottish footballer
- Thomas McKean Thompson McKennan (1794–1852), US congressman from Pennsylvania, US Secretary of the Interior
- William McKennan (1816–1893), United States federal judge

== See also ==
- McKennan Pomeroy (born 2002), Cherokee American singer-songwriter better known as Ken Pomeroy
- McKenna (name)
