= Peter O'Leary =

Peter O'Leary may refer to:

- Peter O'Leary (referee) (born 1972), New Zealand association football referee
- Peter O'Leary (Kerry Gaelic footballer), Gaelic football goalkeeper from County Kerry
- Peter O'Leary (Laois Gaelic footballer) (born 1985), Gaelic football player from Laois in Ireland
- Peter O'Leary (sailor) (born 1983), Irish sailor
- Peadar Ua Laoghaire (1839–1920), Irish-language author
