= McKenna =

McKenna or Makenna may refer to:

- McKenna (name), including a list of people with the name
- McKenna, Washington, an unincorporated town in the United States
- McKenna (TV series), a 1994–1995 ABC series starring Chad Everett and Jennifer Love Hewitt
- Dr. McKenna Cup, Gaelic football competition

== See also ==
- MacKenna (disambiguation)
- Kenna (disambiguation)
- Makena (disambiguation)
- Justice McKenna (disambiguation)
