= Pier Park =

Pier Park may refer to:

- Pier Park (Portland), a municipal park named for Sylvester Charles Pier (1853–1935), Portland, Oregon
- Pier Park, part of Navy Pier, on the Chicago shoreline of Lake Michigan
- Pier Park (Florida), a shopping mall in Panama City Beach, Florida
- St. Petersburg Pier, the pier name of the St. Petersburg Pier
- Piers Park, a public park in East Boston, Massachusetts
