= Stephen McKenna =

Stephen McKenna may refer to:

- Stephen McKenna (novelist) (1888–1967), English novelist
- Stephen McKenna (footballer) (born 1985), Scottish footballer
- Stephen McKenna (artist) (1939–2017), English visual artist
- Stephen McKenna (boxer) (born 1997), Irish boxer
- Stephen MacKenna (1872–1934), Irish translator of Plotinus
- Stephen MacKenna (actor) (born 1945), English actor
- Steve McKenna, ice hockey player
- Steve McKenna, character in The Mechanic (2011 film)
- Steve McKenna, provided voice over for Office Monkey
- Steve McKenna (golfer) in Lytham Trophy
- Steve McKenna (musician) on Return to Evermore

== See also ==
- McKenna (disambiguation)
