= Makena =

Makena may refer to:

- Makena Carr (born 2000), American soccer player
- Makena Onjerika, Kenyan writer
- A brand name of the medication hydroxyprogesterone caproate
- Makena, Hawaii, a census-designated place in Maui County, Hawaii
- Makena State Park
- Makena Beach & Golf Resort, a resort in Maui
- Makena, one of the nine playable characters in the game Minecraft

== See also ==
- McKenna (disambiguation)
- MacKenna (disambiguation)
