= Leo Turley =

Irish Gaelic footballer

Personal information
- Born: 7 December 1966 (age 59) Ireland

Sport
- Sport: Gaelic football
- Position: Forward
Clubs
- Years: Club
- 1984–1997 1998–1999 2000-date: O'Dempseys; Éire Óg; Leixlip
Inter-county
- Years: County
- ?- ?: Laois

Leo Turley (born 7 December 1966) is a former Gaelic footballer from County Laois.

== Playing career ==
Leo played for the Laois senior football team from the late 1980s until the 1990s primarily as a forward.

In 1991, he played on the Laois team beaten by Meath GAA in the final of the Leinster Senior Football Championship.

He began his club football career with his native O'Dempseys with whom he won underage honours and also played for the Éire Óg club in Carlow and Leixlip in Kildare

== Managerial career ==
Leo started his management career with Fenagh in Carlow in 1997 then taking over at Arles/Killeen in Laois before moving to Blackhall Gaels in County Meath who he guided to the Meath Intermediate (2001) and Senior Football Championship title in 2003.

He also managed his native club O'Dempseys in 2004 and 2005 and since then has been manager of Confey in Kildare, Dunshaughlin, Blackhall Gaels again, Donaghmore Ashbourne and Leixlip seniors for one year. He subsequently returned to O'Dempseys in Laois, who gained promotion to senior ranks after winning 2016 Laois Intermediate Championship.
