= Judge McKenna =

Judge McKenna may refer to:

- Charles F. McKenna (1844–1922), judge of the United States District Court for the District of Puerto Rico
- Joseph McKenna (1843–1926), judge of the United States Court of Appeals for the Ninth Circuit prior to his appointment to the Supreme Court of the United States
- Juliet J. McKenna (born 1970), associate judge of the Superior Court of the District of Columbia
- Lawrence M. McKenna (1933–2023), judge of the United States District Court for the Southern District of New York

== See also ==
- Justice McKenna (disambiguation)
