= O'Dempsey's GAA =

GAA club in Killenard, County Laois, Ireland

O'Dempsey's
- Na Díomasaigh
- Founded: 1951
- County: Laois
- Colours: Blue and Amber
- Grounds: Old Pound
- Coordinates: 53°07′06.45″N 7°08′47.81″W

Playing kits
Standard colours

Senior Club Championships
	All Ireland	Leinster champions	Laois champions
Football:	-	-	2

O'Dempsey's GAA is a Gaelic football club located in the northeast of County Laois, Ireland.

== History ==
The club was founded in 1951, won the Laois Junior Football Championship title in that same year and followed up by winning the Laois Intermediate Football Championship title the following year. The club name refers to the Ó Díomasaigh (O'Dempsey) family, the ancient Gaelic rulers of the Clann Mhaolughra (Clanmaliere) region, incorporating Portnahinch and Upper Philipstown on both sides of the River Barrow.

O'Dempsey's went on to win two Laois Senior Football Championship titles in 1963 and 1980.

Locally well-known county players that have played for the club Include Jack Kenna, Mick Aherne, Leo Turley and Peter O'Leary.

O'Dempsey's GAA club grounds are located at the Old Pound, halfway between Ballybrittas and Killenard.

== Achievements ==
- Laois Senior Football Championship: (2) 1963, 1980
- Laois Intermediate Football Championship: (3) 1952, 1977, 2016
- Laois Junior Football Championships: (2) 1951, 2019
- Laois Junior B Football Championship: (2) 1992, 2009
- Laois Junior C Football Championship: (1) 2011
- Laois Minor Football Championship: (2) 1980, 1997
- Laois Minor B Football Championship: (5) 1983, 1984, 1990, 2014, 2015
- Laois Under 21 Football Championship: (1) 1973
- Laois Under 21 B Football Championship: (2) 2010, 2014
- Laois All-County Football League Div. 1: (4) 1990, 2006, 2017, 2018
- Laois All-County Football League Div. 2: (1) 2010
- Laois All-County Football League Div. 4: (1) 2012
- Laois All-County Football League Div. 5: (1) 2010

== Notable players ==
- John Costello
- Leo Turley
- Peter O'Leary
