= Kenna (disambiguation) =

Kenna is a recording artist.

Kenna may also refer to:

- several hurricanes; see Hurricane Kenna (disambiguation)
- The Irish/Scottish feminine form of the given name Kenneth

== Places ==
- Kenna, West Virginia, small community in the United States
- Kenna, New Mexico, small unincorporated village in the United States

== Characters ==
- The Groovy Girls doll line, by Manhattan Toy, features a doll named Kenna.
- Lady Kenna in Reign (TV series)

== People with the surname Kenna ==
- Colin Kenna (born in 1976), Irish boxer
- Conor Kenna (born in 1984), Irish footballer
- Doug Kenna (born in 1924), player of American football
- Edward Kenna (1919-2009), Australian soldier, awarded Victoria Cross
- Ed Kenna, college football coach in the 1900s
- J. N. Kenna (1888–1950), Justice of the Supreme Court of Appeals of West Virginia
- Jack Kenna (born in 1932), player of Gaelic football
- Jamie Kenna, British actor
- Jeff Kenna (born in 1970), Irish footballer
- John E. Kenna (1848–1893), West Virginia politician
- Kathleen Kenna, Canadian journalist
- Michael Kenna (politician) (1857–1946), Chicago politician ("Hiny Dink" Kenna)
- Michael Kenna (photographer) (born in 1953), British photographer
- Paul Aloysius Kenna (1862–1915), English Brigadier General and recipient of Victoria Cross
- Peter Kenna (1930–1987), Australian playwright and radio actor
- Rebecca Kenna (1989), English snooker player

== People with the given name Kenna ==
- Kenna Cross, American politician from New Hampshire
- Kenna Harris, American filmmaker

== See also ==
- Kennan (disambiguation)
- Kenan (disambiguation)
