= Kennan =

Kennan may refer to:

== Places ==
United States

- Kennan, Wisconsin, a village
- Kennan (town), Wisconsin, a town

== Other uses ==
- Kennan (name)
- KH-11 Kennan, a type of American reconnaissance satellite

== See also ==
- Cannan
