= Peter O'Leary (Laois footballer) =

Irish Gaelic footballer

Personal information
- Native name: Peadar Ó Laoire (Irish)
- Born: 1985 (age 40–41) Killenard, County Laois, Ireland
- Height: 5 ft 10 in (178 cm)

Sport
- Sport: Gaelic football
- Position: Wing Back
Club
- Years: Club
- 2003–Present: O'Dempseys
Inter-county
- Years: County
- 2006–2015: Laois
Inter-county titles
- Leinster titles: 1

Peter O'Leary is a Gaelic football player from Laois in Ireland.

In 2003 was part of the Laois team that won the All-Ireland Minor Football Championship title for the first time since 1997.

In 2006, Peter was part of the Laois team that won the Leinster U21 Football Championship and graduated onto the county's senior team later that season, replacing Paul McDonald on the team that played Mayo.

in 2015, Peter announced his retirement from inter county football at the age of 29.

Preceded by Colm Begley	Laois Senior Football Captain; 2012–present	Succeeded by incumbent
