= St. Johns City Hall =

Building in Portland, Oregon, U.S.

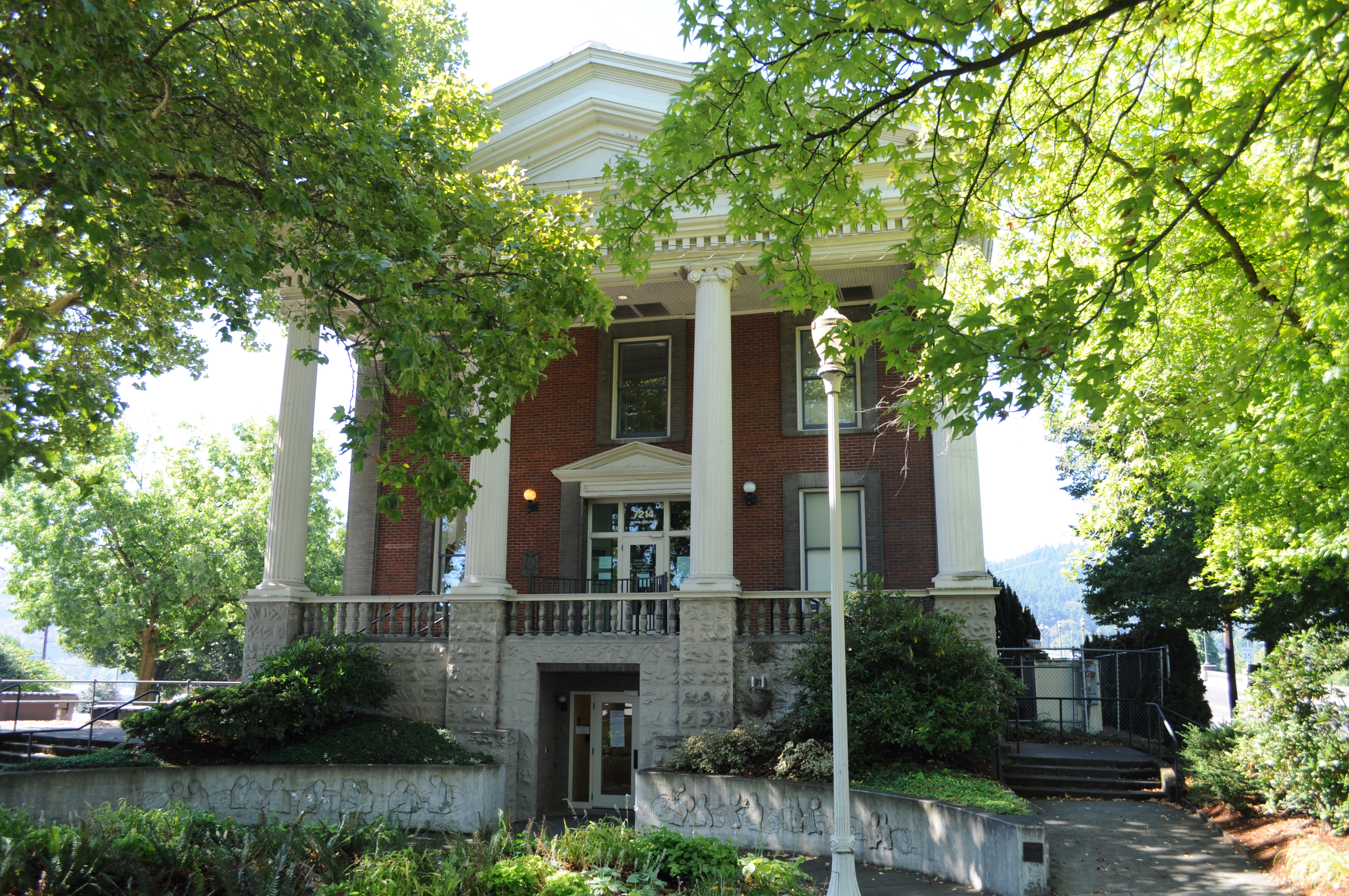
- Interactive map of the St. Johns City Hall area

General information
- Type: municipal
- Architectural style: neo-Georgian
- Location: St. Johns, Oregon (1907–1915); Portland, Oregon (1915–present), 7214 N Philadelphia Ave, United States
- Coordinates: 45°35′20″N 122°45′21″W
- Current tenants: Portland Police Bureau
- Groundbreaking: 1905
- Completed: 1907
- Opened: July 1, 1907
- Renovated: 1976
- Cost: $7,953
- Owner: City of Portland

Technical details
- Floor count: 3

Design and construction
- Architect: W. W. Goodrich
- Main contractor: Youngfedorf & Son
- Designations: Portland Historic Landmark

St. Johns City Hall is a neo-Georgian style municipal building located adjacent to the east end of the St. Johns Bridge in the St. Johns neighborhood of Portland, Oregon. Constructed in 1907 by Youngferdorf & Son the building was the city hall for St. Johns, Oregon. After Portland annexed St. Johns in 1915, the building was turned over to city officials who designated it as the Portland Police Bureau's North Precinct until 2009. It now houses the Police Bureau's Traffic Division.

== History ==
=== City of St. Johns (1905–1915) ===
By 1905, the St. Johns City Council was planning to build a new city hall building. In January 1906, amid financial woes, the city was facing the prospect of selling of their land for which they intended to erect the new municipal building. The land was purchased by Charles Olhouse for $3,500 ($125,417 adjusted for inflation). By January, with one month remaining on their payment deadline, the council had only put-up $200 ($7,167 adjusted for inflation) total. M. L. Holbrook gave the town $2,000 ($71,667 adjusted for inflation) and W. M. Killingsworth contributed $1,000 ($35,833 adjusted for inflation) to the project with the promise that it would be returned in due time. One member of the city council who was adamant in his disapproval of the proposed city hall was Alderman S. C. Norton, who claimed the council was purposely misleading the public and acting against their will. Norton claimed that the proposed $10,000 ($358,333 adjusted for inflation) to build a new city hall was a made-up figure. Ultimately a $7,953 ($284,982 adjusted for inflation) contract was granted to Youngferdorf & Son, who would be responsible for the building's foundation, outside and inside walls, roof, gas piping, and flooring.

The city hall contract was to be completed in just two months, November and December 1906. But Youngfedorf & Son failed to meet the deadline, causing the city to step in and take over the operation. The contractors were paid just $2,000 ($71,667 adjusted for inflation), with $800 ($28,667 adjusted for inflation) worth of work to still be done on the building. This alarmed Alderman S. C. Norton, who said there was a "conspiracy" between the contractors and Alderman, and hoped to get to the bottom of it. Norton sharply questioned City Recorder Thorndyke about the haste placed on the construction of the building. He and City Attorney Green, as well as councilmen W. H. King, felt that Norton was grasping at straws. The building's architect, W. W. Goodrich, explained in a letter to the council that the contract was not completed due to poor weather and failed shipments. Eventually, Goodrich won the favor of Mayor Hinman, who called for the contact be restored to Youngfedorf & Son.

A week later the architect was dead. Goodrich's son took the project over. It was scheduled to be completed and ready for use by July 1, 1907. The two-story brick building on concrete foundation had offices for the mayor, city recorder, city attorney, chief of police and the fire department, as well as a gymnasium and a records room on the first floor. The second floor had the council's chambers which encompassed most of the floor. Smaller rooms were also on the second floor, to be used as committee and jury rooms. The basement featured jail cells.

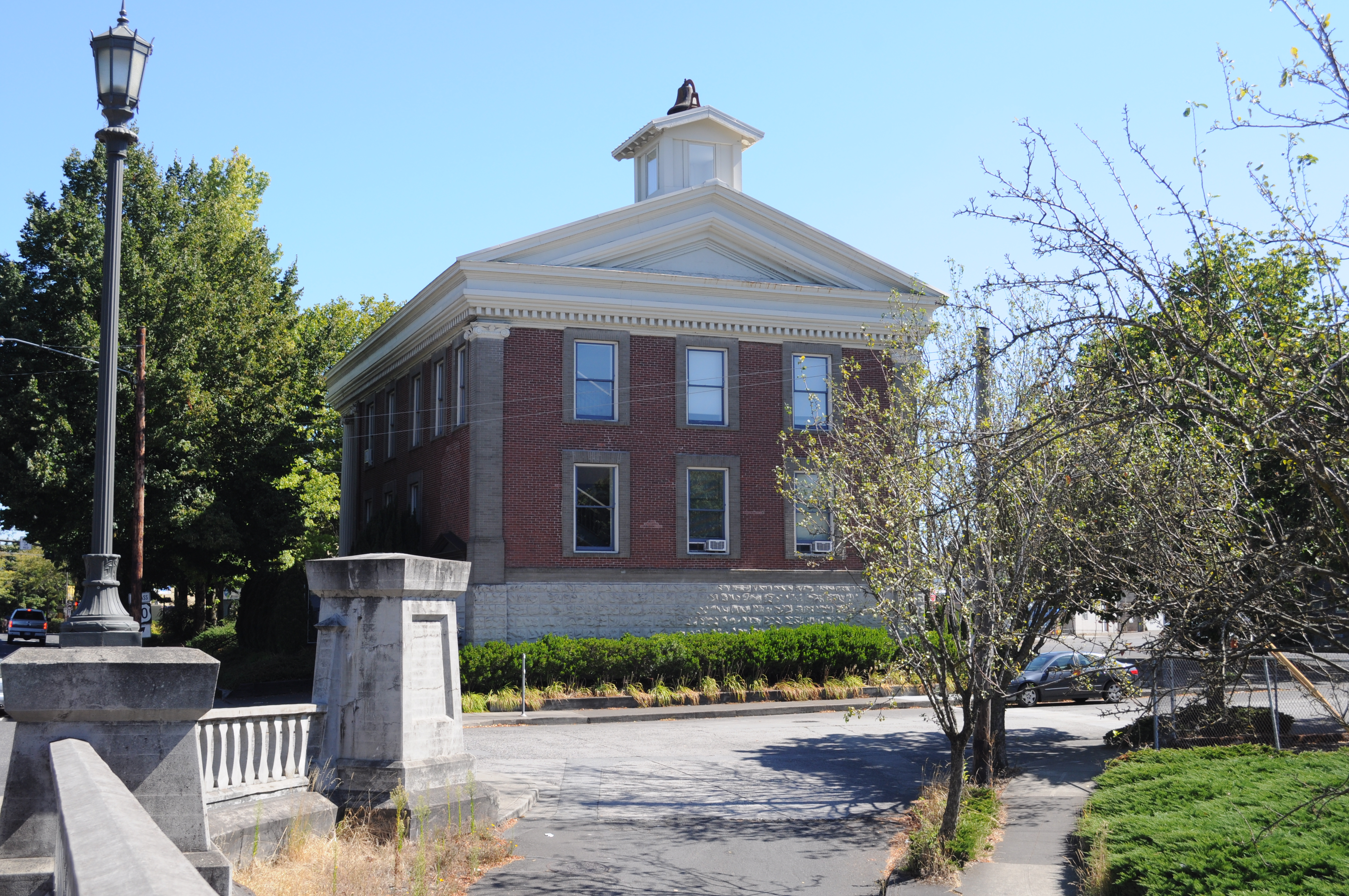
The building photographed from the St. Johns Bridge.

After it was voted that St. Johns would be annexed into the City of Portland the mayor of St. Johns made his final order, that the prison's lone inmate be freed. The keys were turned over to Portland officials on July 8, 1915, along with $292.69 ($9,323 adjusted for inflation) from the treasury. It was noted that there was a balance of $6019.10 ($191,562 adjusted for inflation) on the books just a week prior, prompting Portland officials to launch an investigation.

=== City of Portland (1915–present) ===
After St. Johns was annexed in 1915, the City of Portland used the building to house members of Portland Fire & Rescue and the Portland Police Bureau. In 1954, a new fire station was built in St. Johns leaving the police as the lone tenant in the city hall. In 1976, the building was temporarily closed for improvements which was a part of an urban renewal plan spearheaded by mayor Neil Goldschmidt. In the late 1970s, the Portland Police Bureau allowed the St. John Booster Club to use the conference room. Plans to close the precinct were announced in 1994, but canceled at the urging of St. Johns residents and mayor Vera Katz. Budget cuts forecasted the need to close the building in 1997, but again mayor Katz led the effort to save the precinct which was ultimately successful. It was again defended by Katz during 2002 budget cuts. By 2007, the Portland Police Bureau lowest volume of calls came from the north precinct. In 2009, Portland Police Chief Rosie Sizer announced the consolidation of Portland's five police precincts into three, combining North and Northeast into one larger North Precinct which would be headquartered out of the former Northeast precinct building located at NE Emerson and MLK Jr. Blvd. The old North precinct building has since been home to PPB's Traffic Division.
