= John Costello (Gaelic footballer) =

Irish Gaelic footballer

John Costello is a former Gaelic football player from County Laois in Ireland.

He played for many years on the Laois senior football team in midfield. He also represented London, New York, Leinster, and Ireland.

In 1986, he was a member of the Laois senior football team that won the county's second National Football League title.

A native of Killenard, Costello played his club football with the O'Dempseys club with whom he played when the club won its second Laois Senior Football Championship title in 1980.

== Bibliography ==
- Comhairle Laighean 1900-2000, Tom Ryall, 2000
- Complete Handbook of Gaelic Games, Raymond Smith, 1999
- Laois GAA Yearbook 1999, Leinster Express, 1999
