= Alan McKenna =

Alan McKenna may refer to:

- Alan McKenna (actor), British actor
- Alan McKenna (footballer) (born 1961), Scottish footballer
- Alan McKenna (Neighbours), fictional character on the Australian soap opera Neighbours
