= MacKenna =

MacKenna is usually a surname, and may refer to

- Sir James MacKenna (1872–1940), British-Indian civil servant
- John MacKenna (born 1952), Irish playwright and novelist
- Juan Mackenna (1771–1814), military officer
- Kenneth MacKenna (1899–1962), American actor and director
- Stephen MacKenna (1872–1934), Irish linguist, journalist, translator and author
- Benjamín Vicuña Mackenna (1831–1886), Chilean politician and writer, grandson of the above Juan

== See also ==
- Mackenna's Gold, 1969 western film
- McKenna (disambiguation)
- Kenna (disambiguation)
- Makena (disambiguation)
