= John McKenna (disambiguation) =

John McKenna (1855–1936) was an Irish businessman, rugby player, and first manager of Liverpool F.C.

John McKenna or MacKenna may also refer to:

== Entertainment ==
- John McKenna (flautist) (1880–1947), Irish-American flautist
- John MacKenna (born 1952), Irish playwright and novelist
- John McKenna (sculptor) (born 1964), British/Scottish sculptor

== Sports ==
- John McKenna (footballer) (1882–?), English footballer who played as a defender
- John McKenna (American football) (1914–2007), American football player, coach, and administrator
- John McKenna (hurler) (1938–2025), Irish hurler
- Johnny McKenna (1926–1980), Irish footballer
- Jack McKenna (born 1942), Irish darts player

== Other ==
- John McKenna (usher) (1841–1898), Irish American civil servant; Chief Usher of the White House
- John or Juan Mackenna (1771–1814), Irishman hero of the Chilean War of Independence
