= Alan McKenna (footballer) =

Scottish footballer

Personal information
- Full name: Alan Millar McKenna
- Date of birth: 4 August 1961 (age 65)
- Place of birth: Edinburgh, Scotland
- Position: Forward

Senior career*
Years	Team	Apps	(Gls)
1978–1981	Millwall	30	(4)
1981–1982	Berwick Rangers	10	(2)
1982–1983	Falkirk	4	(0)
1983–1984	Cowdenbeath	2	(0)
	Craigroyston	?	(?)
	Tranent	?	(?)
1988–1989	Arbroath	39	(13)
1989–1991	Whitehill Welfare	?	(?)
1991–1992	Arbroath	32	(10)
Total		117	(29)
- * Club domestic league appearances and goals

Alan Millar McKenna (born 4 August 1961), is a Scottish footballer who played as a forward in the Football League. He was born in Edinburgh.
