= Pier Park (Portland, Oregon) =

Public park in Portland, Oregon, U.S.

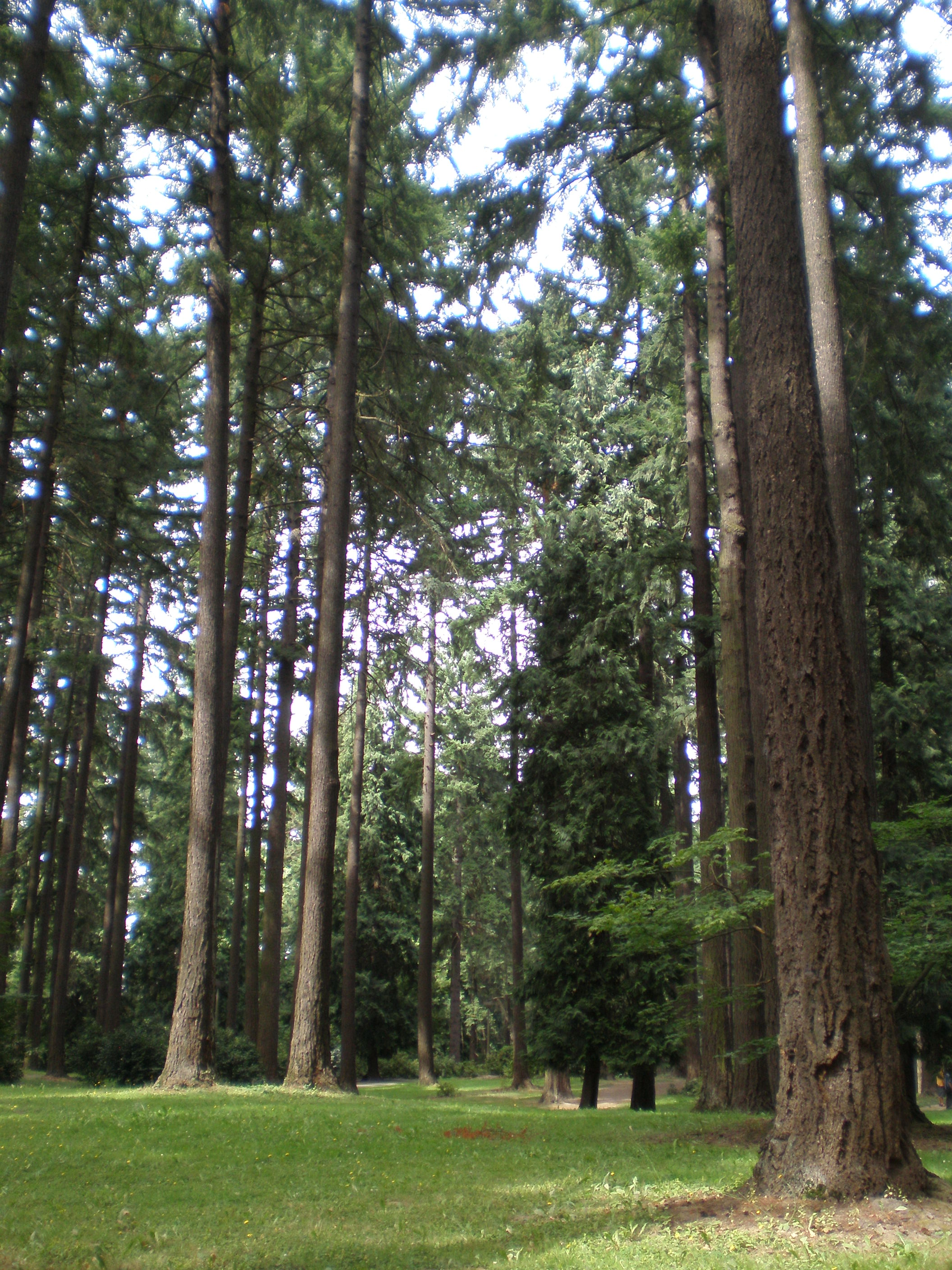
- The park in 2010
- Interactive map of Pier Park
- Type: Urban park
- Location: N Lombard St. and Bruce Ave. Portland, Oregon
- Coordinates: 45.603°N 122.755°W
- Area: 85.00 acres (34.40 ha)
- Created: 1920
- Operator: Portland Parks & Recreation Department
- Status: Open 5 a.m. to midnight daily

Pier Park is a municipal park in Portland, Oregon, United States. It is in the North Portland neighborhood of St. Johns and is bordered by North Columbia Boulevard and characterized by evergreen forest. Pier Park, along with Kelley Point Park and Smith and Bybee Wetlands Natural Area, contributes land in its natural state to North Portland.

The park takes its name from a person named Pier, not because it has a pier.

== History ==
The parcel of land on which the park was developed was part of the James Loomis donation land claim. The city of Portland passed an ordinance in 1921 naming the park for Sylvester Charles Pier (1853–1935). Previously a sales manager of Marshall Wells Hardware Company, Pier took office as City commissioner in 1919, serving four years in charge of parks. His son, Stanhope S. Pier succeeded him as commissioner and served two terms. Prior to the park, St. Johns brick company operated just a block away, until 1905 when the factory ran out of clay. The abandoned brickyard was used as a playground until 1920 when the buildings were demolished. In development of the area which was previously a wetland more than 100 men were employed from the unemployment list. Wood from clearing the site was sent to local families in need of fuel. On July 11, 1934, during a coast-wide Maritime strike, local striking longshoremen blocked railroad tracks leading into their worksite to prevent scabs from being brought in. Police fired on them, wounding 4. Bullets lodged in park trees, saving the strikers from more serious consequences. The event is called Bloody Wednesday and is still commemorated by the local International Longshore Warehouse Union.

== Amenities ==
Park amenities include a baseball field, basketball court, soccer field, tennis court, restrooms, disabled access picnic areas, disc golf course, and paved and unpaved paths. The play structures were renovated and added to in the summer of 2007 as part of an effort to improve old equipment. A concrete skatepark resides at the Southwest end of the park, first developed by the Army Corps of Engineers in 2001, and later redeveloped by Dreamland Skateparks with a sidewalk entry designed by Adam Kuby. It is 11,070 square feet (1,028 m^{2}).

== Pier Pool ==
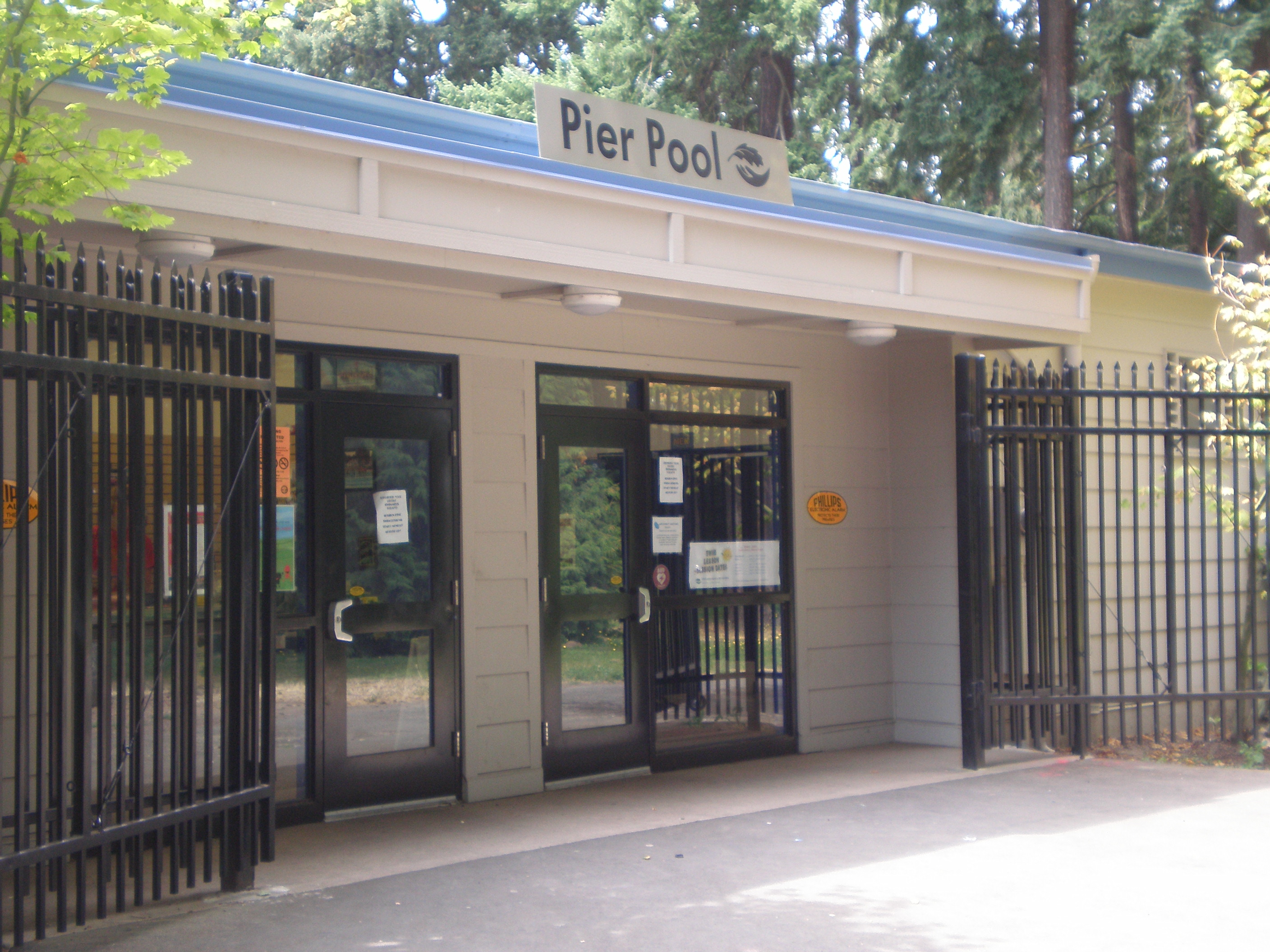
Entrance to Pier Pool

The Southwest corner has Pier Pool, which is open in the summer season. The park was dedicated in 1940, including the pool. The first swimmer was the reigning Junior Rose Festival Queen. The pool was closed by the City Council, but received federal funding in Spring 2007 to be reopened in 2008.

== Works cited ==
- St. John's Heritage Foundation 4th edition 1959
