= Office Monkey =

British game show

- Series 2 break bumper
- Starring: Steve Jones (Series 1); Steve McKenna (Series 2)
- No. of series: 2
- No. of episodes: 19 (series 1: 9 editions, Series 2: 10 editions)

Production
- Producer: Princess Productions
- Running time: 30 minutes

Original release
- Network: ITV2
- Release: 2003 – 2005

Office Monkey was a British hidden camera comedy game show programme that aired on ITV2 for two series from 2003 to 2005. Series 1 was presented by Steve Jones and series 2 was voiced over by Steve McKenna. In each episode, two people are challenged to perform silly comic dares in an office of unsuspecting people recorded by hidden cameras. The only other person in on the joke is the managing director, who watches the "office monkeys" perform and then decides which of them wins.
