= Jack Kenna =

Irish Gaelic footballer (1932–2023)

Personal information
- Native name: Jeaic Mac Cionaoith (Irish)
- Born: 1932 Kilmullen, Portarlington, County Laois, Ireland
- Died: 16 December 2023 (aged 90–91)

Sport
- Sport: Gaelic football
- Position: Forward
Clubs
- Years: Club
- ???? – 1950 1951 – 1962: Jamestown; O'Dempseys
Inter-county
Years	County	Apps (scores)
???? – 1961	Laois	16 (4-60)
Inter-county titles
- Leinster titles: 0
- All-Irelands: 0
- All Stars: 0

Jack Kenna (1932 – 16 December 2023) was an Irish Gaelic footballer from County Laois. He was born in Kilmullen.

== Biography ==
Kenna played for many years on the Laois senior football team in the forwards and was widely regarded as one of the outstanding players in Ireland of the 1950s. He also played for his province Leinster, winning three Railway Cup medals in 1955, 1959 and 1961.

He began his football career with the Jamestown club. From 1951 onwards, he played for the O'Dempseys club and retired in 1962, the year before the club won its first Laois Senior Football Championship title. When he retired in 1962, he was Laois' top-scoring NFL player at that time, with (7-107) 128pts.

Kenna died at his home on 16 December 2023.
