= Portland Woolen Mills =

Defunct textile manufacturer in Portland, Oregon

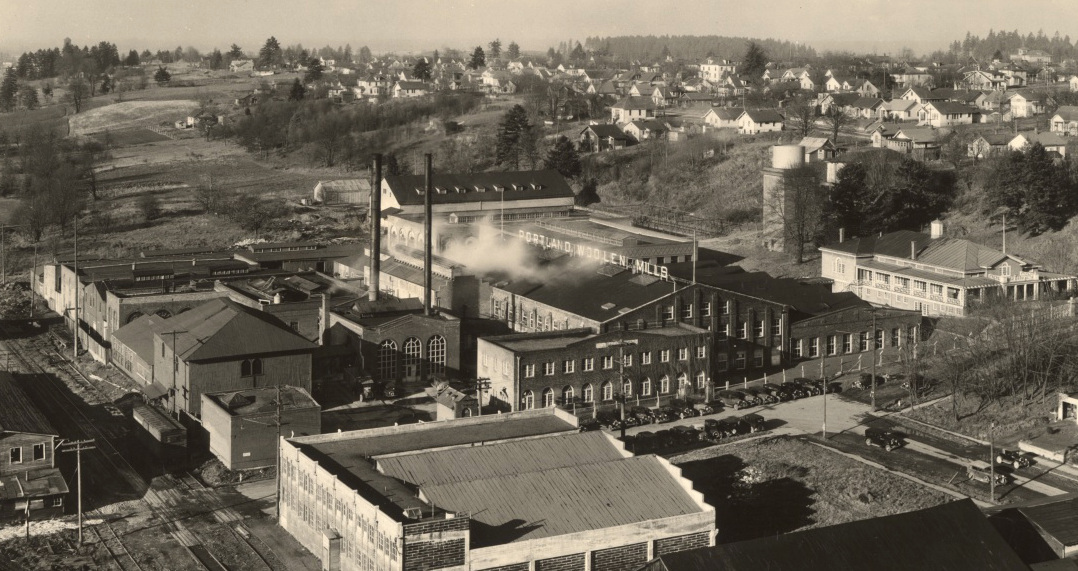
- The Portland Woolen Mills in 1935
- Type: Manufacturer
- Industry: Textile industry
- Founded: 1901
- Defunct: 1960
- Headquarters: Sellwood, Oregon (1901–04); St. Johns, Oregon (1904–15); Portland, Oregon (1915–60)
- Key people: Charles H. Carter (executive director, 1935–52); Charles H. Carter, Jr. (executive director, 1952–60)
- Products: Blankets, clothing, upholstery
- Number of employees: 100–500

The Portland Woolen Mills were a wool textile manufacturer in the St. Johns neighborhood of Portland, Oregon, United States. By 1950, they had become the largest wool manufacturer west of Cleveland, Ohio. The origins of the factory started in Sellwood, Oregon, in 1901 but after a fire destroyed the mill two years later owners decided to rebuild in St. Johns. Portland Woolen Mills offered several worker programs, including baseball, basketball, and bowling teams; a cafeteria; and a library.

Labor disputes started during the 1934 textile workers strike when Portland Woolen Mills employees walked-off the job for two days. Two years later workers held a strike and were granted representation by the Congress of Industrial Organizations (CIO) labor union. The factory filled contracts for the United States Federal Government during much of its history, primarily making blankets for the armed forces. For their work in producing blankets during World War II, the Portland Woolen Mills won an Army-Navy "E" Award. The factory closed in 1960 after almost 59 years of service.

== History ==
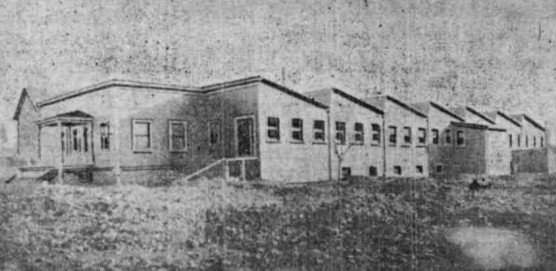
The Portland Woolen Mills in Sellwood, Oregon, which burnt to the ground in 1904. The following year the mill relocated to St. Johns, Oregon.

Founded in Sellwood, Oregon, in 1901, the Portland Woolen Mills relocated to the town of St. Johns in 1904 after a fire destroyed their old factory. Their old factory was a total loss, costing them US$150,000 (US$5,375,000 adjusted for inflation). The property the new factory was on consisted of four buildings over five acres of land. The main factory was a 100 ft. by 200 ft. brick and concrete two-story. Other buildings on the site included a 45 ft. by 50 ft. boiler and engine room and a 40 ft. by 100 ft. wool weaving warehouse. The total cost of the new St. Johns plant was US$600,000 (US$21,500,000 adjusted for inflation). The company reportedly turned a US$300,000 (US$10,750,000 adjusted for inflation) profit in 1906. In 1911, a female worker was critically injured when she got caught in a belt which caused her to be hit in the head by the machinery.

At its inception, the mill could produce 1,500 yards of wool per day. By 1913, that number was nearly 60,000 yards per day. During a large town-wide fire in 1905, the Portland Woolen Mills suffered US$300 worth (US$10,750 adjusted for inflation) of damage. In 1913, the mill constructed a new 80 ft. by 200 ft. building on the site which cost US$600,000 (US$1,954,545 adjusted for inflation). Vents in the roof were added to the entire building during the renovations. Lewis I. Thompson was the architect who designed the new building. During this time, the company decided to install a cafeteria and library for their employees. The renovations allowed management to add 500 new workers which doubled their overall productivity.

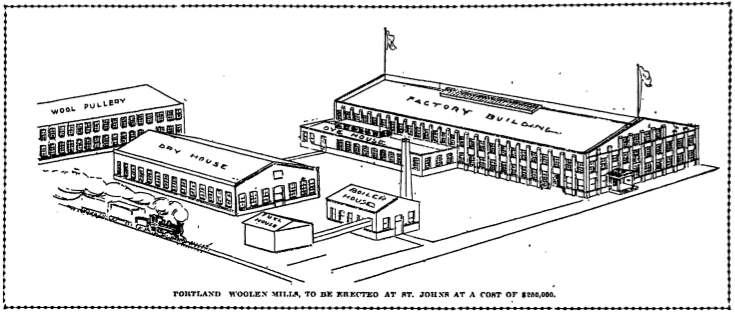
A drawing of the Portland Woolen Mills in St. Johns.

A fire broke out in the factory in March 1914 causing US$600,000 (US$1,928,571 adjusted for inflation). In 1917, the plant reported a US$700,000 (US$1,759,091 adjusted for inflation) profit. Several orders came in that year from automobile manufacturers who were using wool upholstery in their vehicles. The rebuilding began a few days after the disaster. During World War I, the Portland Woolen Mills were contracted to manufacture clothing and blankets for the United States Armed Forces. They also bid on contracts for Russian soldiers on the Eastern Front. When the war was dying down, production at the plant dropped after demand started to curtail. After failing to meet increasing demand in 1919, the woolen mills added 150 new employees to rectify the issue.

During World War II, the United States federal government granted the Portland Woolen Mills contracts for wool blankets. In 1943, the factory won an Army-Navy "E" Award for their production. By 1950, the Portland Woolen Mills had become the largest wool manufacturer in the United States west of Cleveland, Ohio. In 1951, the Portland Woolen Mills won a US$200,000 contract for the United States Armed Forces. From its 1935 to 1952, the Portland Woolen Mills were led by executive director Charles H. Carter, who died two years after his retirement. His son Charles H. Carter, Jr. succeed him in that position. In 1960, the Portland Woolen Mills announced it would cease operations. At the time of the closure, the factory employed 100 people. Carter cited increasing production costs due to foreign competition as the reason he closed the mill.

=== Employee activities ===
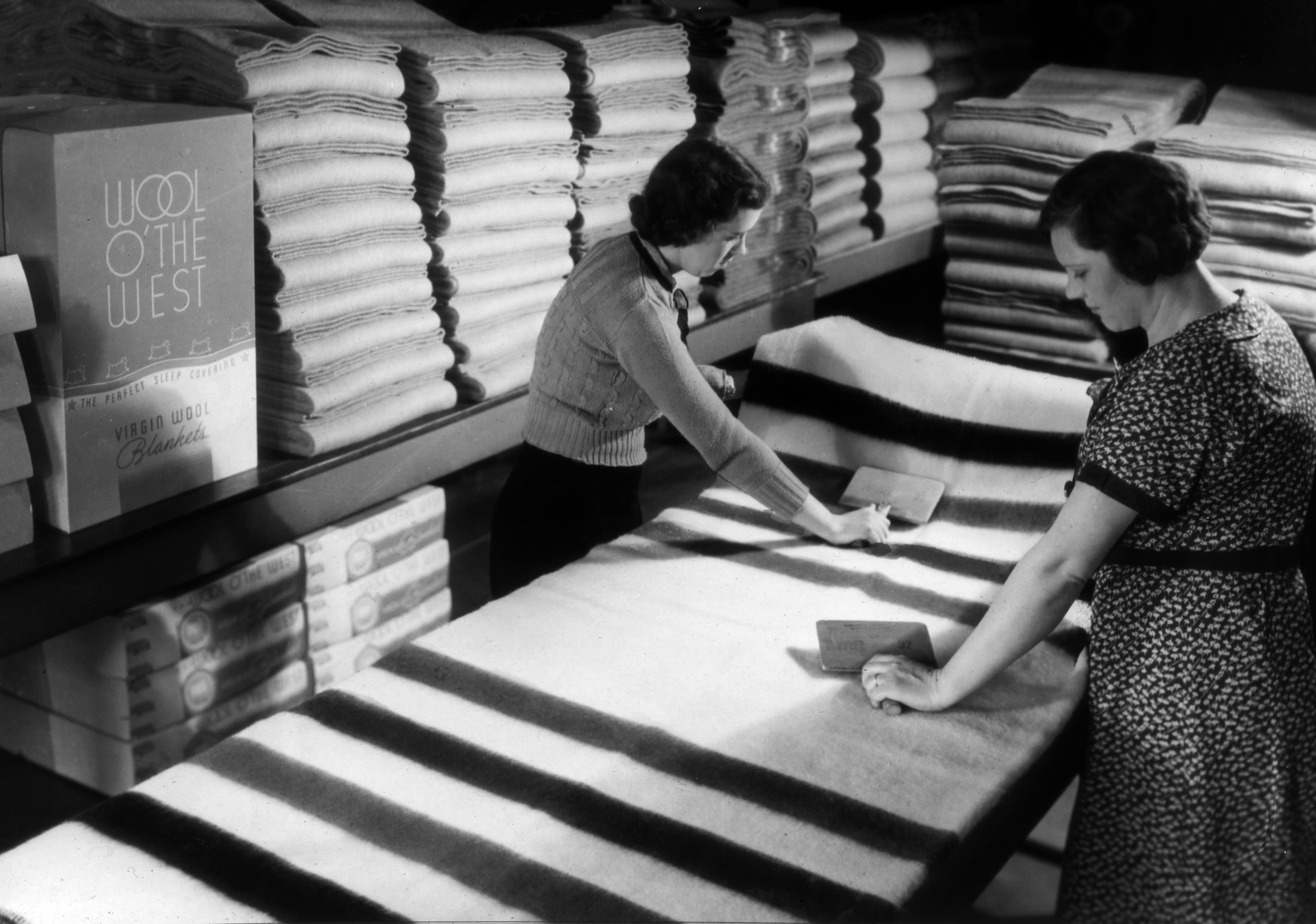
Two female employees of the Portland Woolen Mills circa 1940s

In 1907, the Portland Woolen Mills management donated US$300 (US$10,366 adjusted for inflation) to buy books for the new St. Johns library. In 1921, management put on a melodrama play for their employees entitled The Fruit of His Folly by playwright Arthur Lewis Tubbs. A bowling team of Portland Woolen Mills workers was organized in 1916. They played in a league which featured other St. Johns clubs and businesses. The Portland Woolen Mills organized a baseball team for their workers in the 1920s. They played in a league with different companies and town teams including Standard Oil and Camas, Washington. In the mid-1920s, the Portland Woolen mills organized a basketball team who played in a city-wide league.

=== Labor disputes ===
A case brought by female Portland Woolen Mills employees to the Oregon Industrial Welfare Commission in 1919 argued that they should not have to work longer than 8-hour days for a maximum of 48 hours a week. Management countered with a 10-hour a day limit, but the commission sided with the workers by restricting the hours female employees could work per their request. In 1920, management threatened to temporarily close the plant after demand diminished. However, workers negotiated for the payroll to be cut by nine percent to keep the factory open.

One-hundred workers for the Portland Woolen Mils walked off the job in September 1934 in solidarity with textile workers who had been striking across the United States. The walk-out had little effect as workers returned to their positions in the factory after two days. Two years later, workers had a three-week strike which was successful in getting them represented by a labor union. A three-week-long series of protests involving 500 Congress of Industrial Organizations (CIO) employees of the Portland Woolen Mills, a contract was agreed upon and full productivity was returned.

== See also ==
- Pendleton Woolen Mills

== Bibliography ==
- Bottenberg, Jenna; Bottenberg, Ray (2008). Vanishing Portland. Mount Pleasant, South Carolina: Arcadia Publishing. ISBN 978-0738558301.
- Lomax, Alfred Lewis (1974). Later Woolen Mills in Oregon: A History of the Woolen Mills which Followed the Pioneer Mills. Hillsboro, Oregon: Binford & Mort.
- Lomax, Alfred Lewis. The Portland Woolen Mills, Inc. Eugene, Oregon: University of Oregon, School of Business Administration.
- Lomax, Alfred Lewis (1941). Pioneer Woolen Mills in Oregon: History of Wool and the Woolen Textile Industry in Oregon, 1811–1875. Hillsboro, Oregon: Binford & Mort.
