= St. Johns Twin Cinema =

Movie theater in Portland, Oregon, U.S.

- Northgate Theater; St. Johns Theater
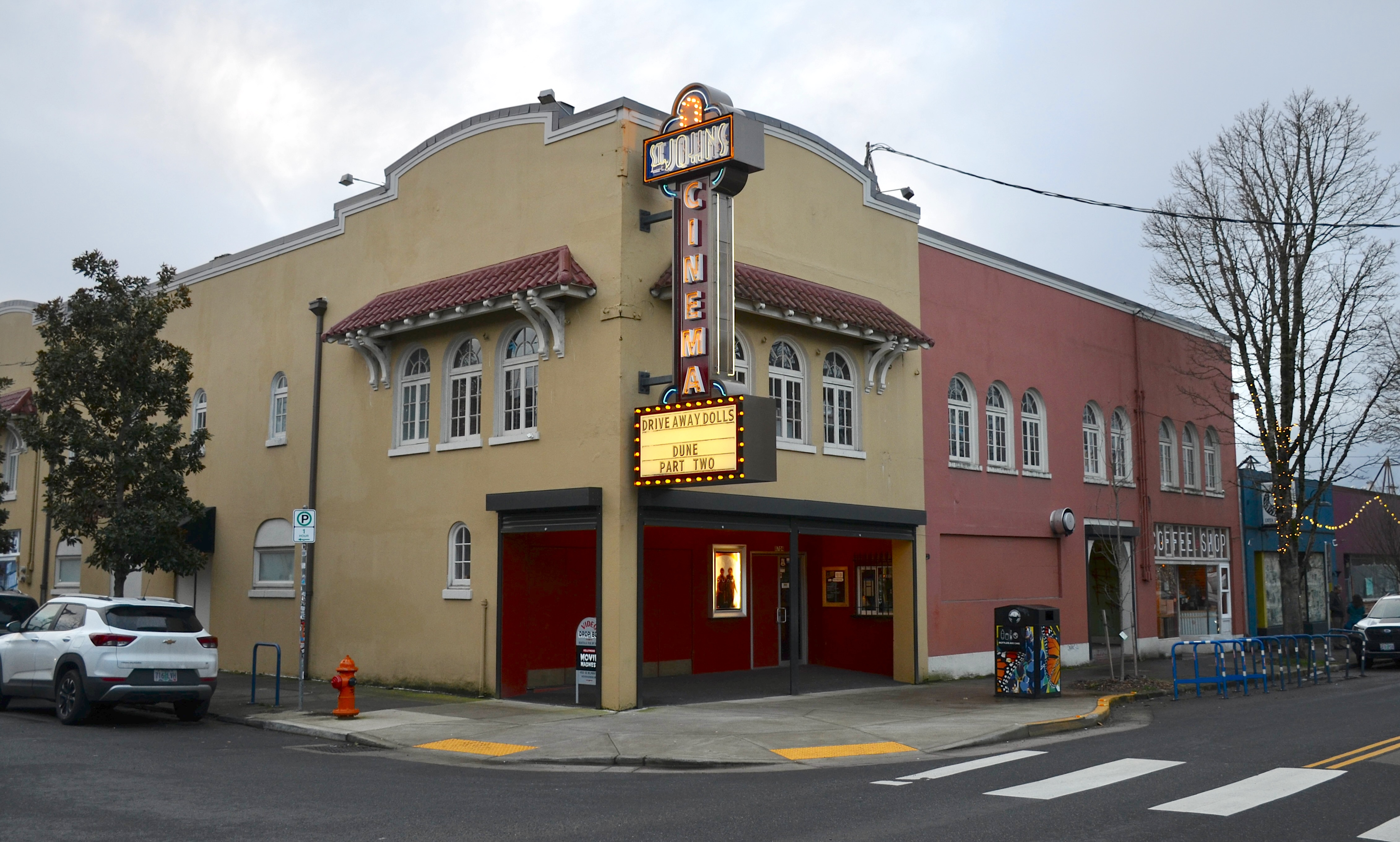
- Exterior in 2024
- Interactive map of St. Johns Twin Cinema
- Address: 8704 N Lombard St; Portland, Oregon; United States
- Coordinates: 45°35′26″N 122°45′20″W

Construction
- Opened: 1913
- Rebuilt: 1983, 2004

Website
- www.stjohnscinema.com/index.php

The St. Johns Twin Cinema, formerly known as the Northgate Theater and the St. Johns Theater, is a movie theater located in the St. Johns neighborhood of Portland, Oregon, United States. It was opened in 1913 by the People's Amusement Company. St. Johns was a city at the time of the theater's opening but was annexed by Portland in July 1915.

== History ==
Plans to build a "modern" theater in what was then the city of St. Johns were announced in 1913 by C. A. Metzger of the People's Amusement Company. The blueprints called for a concrete 2 1/2-story, 50 by 100 ft. building that was estimated to cost $30,000 (US$1,036,607 adjusted for inflation). It featured a 650-seat auditorium.

In 1915, the St. Johns City Council voted in favor of an ordinance that would censor a film entitled The House of Bondage and put in place a board of censorship to weed-out "lewd" films, spearheaded by socialist mayor A. W. Vincent. Managers of the theatre were supportive of the censorship board and refused to show the film a year before the ordinance was enacted. A few months later, in July 1915, St. Johns was annexed by the much larger city of Portland.

The theater hosted a town hall event in 1928 about the proposition of a new bridge over the Willamette River in St. Johns. The St. Johns Bridge was completed in 1931.

In 1983, the theater was fully renovated by David A. Jones and David H. Evans, who were renovating several theaters around Portland. The main floor auditorium featured 350 seats and the upstairs featured 225 seats. On July 7, 1986, there was a fire in an apartment above the theater after a firecracker was thrown through the window and into a waste basket.
