= Killenard =

Village in County Laois, Ireland

Killenard Irish: Coill An Aird
- Village
- Location in Ireland
- Coordinates: 53°7′58″N 7°8′55″W
- Country: Ireland
- Province: Leinster
- County: Laois

Population (2016)
  - Total: 671
- Time zone: UTC+0 (WET)
  - Summer (DST): UTC-1 (IST (WEST))

Killenard (Irish: Coill An Aird, meaning 'the wood of the height') is a village in County Laois, Ireland. It lies in the historic barony of Portnahinch and within the administrative area of Laois County Council.

As of the 2016 census, the village had a population of 671 people, up from 622 inhabitants in the 2011 census. Formerly a small village, a number of housing developments were built in the area during the "Celtic Tiger" era.

The Heritage Hotel and Golf Resort, located close to the village centre, was built in 2004. The local Roman Catholic (Saint John's) church and Church of Ireland (Lea) church both date from the early 19th century.

== See also ==
- O'Dempseys GAA, local Gaelic football club
