= Francis I. McKenna =

American land and real estate developer

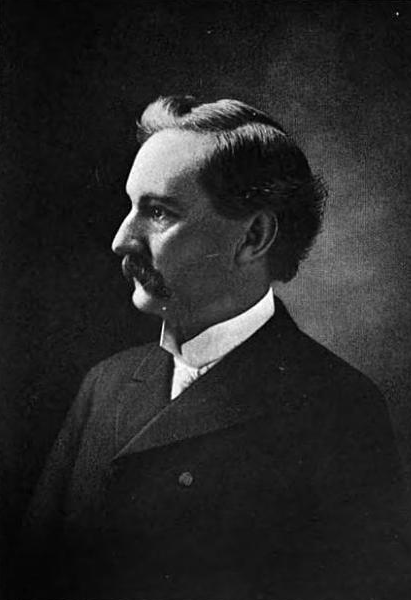
- Born: February 25, 1859; Perry County, Illinois
- Died: February 24, 1914 (aged 55); Portland, Oregon
- Education: Self-taught
- Occupations: Real estate and land development; educator
- Spouse: Laura Linebaugh
- Children: Coe A. McKenna

Francis I. McKenna (February 25, 1859 – February 24, 1914) was a real estate and land developer, and architect from the 1890s to the 1920s in Portland, Oregon. McKenna moved to Portland in 1889 and purchased the land now known as the University Park neighborhood. He went on to establish the Portland Belt Line Company, which lobbied city officials to extend the cable car system to St. Johns, Oregon. The project was constructed in 1905. McKenna was also known as an advocate of civic improvement and industrialization.

Born to farmers in Illinois, McKenna was orphaned at the age of 12. This forced him to find work in labor, including farming and building railroads. When he turned 18, McKenna had enough formal and informal education to ascertain a job at a rural Ohio public school. Eventually, he was offered a job at Creighton University which he held for two years. McKenna quit his profession and packed up for Oregon in 1889 with his wife Laura and son Coe. North McKenna avenue and McKenna park were named in honor of the University Park developer. His son, Coe, continued the family's real estate legacy.

== Early and personal life ==
Francis I. McKenna was born on February 25, 1859, in Perry County, Illinois, to William and Charity McKenna (née) Burgoon. The McKenna family originally hailed from Belfast, Ireland. Francis McKenna was educated in public schools from age six to 12 for three to six months a year until his parents died. From there, McKenna was self-taught, taking odd jobs on farms and railroads until at 18 he was hired to educate at a public school in Ohio. Two years later he took a job at Creighton University in Omaha, Nebraska. He walked away from teaching in 1883.

McKenna married Laura Linebaugh in 1884 in Chicago, Illinois. The couple had one child, a son, Coe A. McKenna. Coe McKenna would go on to graduate from George Washington University in 1910.

== Business career ==
McKenna helped organize a Board of Trade amongst Portland's business community. McKenna served as the board's first chairman and in his first annual address, laid out a plan to attract manufacturing plants to the city. McKenna served as the president of the Portland Belt Company since its founding in 1893. Their main purpose was advocating the construction of a cable car from East Portland, Oregon, to St. Johns, Oregon, along the Columbia Slough. McKenna's project was originally approved, but when the Panic of 1893 came the line was canceled mid-construction. A re-approval of the project came in 1905. McKenna advocated for public control of the cable car, saying the city should construct the line and either contract the operation out or run it themselves. In 1903, McKenna secured a double-track electric streetcar line to the peninsula with the Portland Railway Company.

=== Land development ===
In 1889, McKenna moved to Portland, Oregon, and invested in a large amount of land, the majority of which was in the University Park neighborhood. With the rapid growth of the city came a growth in investments for McKenna. His first newspaper advertisement appeared in 1890 where he was noted as the manager of the Conservative Real Estate & Trust Company. By 1892, McKenna was advertising as the sole agent for the University Park neighborhood. In 1894, McKenna constructed a three-story brick building in the heart of University Park. When the Archdiocese of Portland purchased the land of the former Portland University to erect a new University of Portland, they went to McKenna to secure more 23 acres of more land for $20,000 ($744,231 adjusted for inflation). In 1910, McKenna purchased 1,280 acres of land for US$12,800 in a rural area near Chitwood, Oregon, where he established a ranch.

McKenna Park, named for the University Park developer, was created to accommodate the Portsmouth baseball team in the Tri-City League during the 1910 season. Officially the park was fenced off five years before, but it was not being used during that time. In 1919, the park was considered for the site of a new highschool, but eventually another plot was selected. The sites original boundaries stretched from to Lombard street on the Northside, McKenna avenue to the east and Dawson street to the south. McKenna owned land in other cities, including Bend, Oregon. In 1909, he made a large land acquisition from the University Land Company, buying most of their plots. McKenna's purchased included 500 lots for US$180,000 ($6.45 million adjusted for inflation).

== Political and civic advocacy ==
Early in his land development career, McKenna devoted portions of his advertising to his personal opinions on politics and civic matters. His first opinion was published in his ad which appeared in the edition of April 2, 1893, of The Oregonian which stated his opposition to a miller regulation bill. In 1894, McKenna lobbied the Albina, Oregon, city council to construct wide boulevards, which was approved. They were the first of the kind in the Portland area. McKenna subscribed to the City Beautiful movement, which was a push in urban cities to beautify the community. An early example of this was when McKenna worked for Dr. C. C. Stratton, then-president of Portland University, who advocated for Oregon to have an open immigration stance. McKenna established the United Artisans club in Portland. McKenna also founded the Initiative One Hundred, a community action committee. He announced his resignation from office in 1903, and again planned to resign following some controversy in 1907, but reconsidered and kept the position. He served as the Oregon Board of Trade chairman starting in 1901.

== Death and legacy ==
McKenna died of a brain aneurysm on February 24, 1914, after battling severe mental health problems. His funeral was held on February 26, 1914, and he was interred at Mount Cavalry Cemetery. After his death, the McKenna estate was valued a US$187,748 ($6.03 million adjusted for inflation). His wife and son had to pay $711 a piece in inheritance taxes. Coe McKenna went on to take over the family development business. He later served on the Multnomah County planning board and in the Oregon Senate.
