= Kennan (name) =

Kennan is both a surname and a given name. Notable people with the name include:

Surname:

- Elizabeth Topham Kennan (born 1938), American academic
- George Kennan (explorer) (1845–1924), American explorer of Russia and an early "Russia Expert"
- George F. Kennan (1904–2005), member of the United States Foreign Service and considered to be the "architect" of American Cold War strategy
- Jim Kennan (1946–2010), Australian politician and adjunct professor of law
- Kent Kennan (1913–2003), American educator and composer
- Larry Kennan (born 1944), former American football coach

Given name:

- Kennan Adeang (1942-2011), former president of Nauru
