= J. N. Kenna =

American judge (1888–1950)

Jo N. Kenna (January 10, 1888 – January 20, 1950) was a justice of the Supreme Court of Appeals of West Virginia from January 1, 1933, until his death on January 20, 1950.

Born in Charleston, West Virginia, McKenna attended the public schools and Mount St. Mary's University before receiving his law degree from the University of Virginia School of Law in 1910. In 1930, he was elected as a Democrat to the West Virginia House of Delegates, representing Kanawha County, West Virginia. The following year, he was elected to a twelve-year term on the state supreme court, to which he was reelected in 1944.

In June 1916, Kenna married Louise Montcastle of Knoxville, Tennessee, with whom he has a son and a daughter who survived him. He died of a heart attack while dining at a restaurant in downtown Charleston, ten days after his 62nd birthday.

Political offices
Preceded by Frank Lively	Justice of the Supreme Court of Appeals of West Virginia; 1933–1950	Succeeded by Leslie E. Given
