= Chris McKenna =

Chris McKenna may refer to:

- Chris McKenna (rugby league) (born 1974), Australian former rugby league footballer
- Chris McKenna (writer), American television writer, producer and film writer
- Chris McKenna (actor) (born 1977), American actor
