= Donald McKenna =

Donald McKenna may refer to:

- Donald McKenna (cricketer) (1944–1995), Australian cricketer
- Donald McKenna (philanthropist) (1907–1997), American philanthropist
