= Kevin McKenna =

Kevin McKenna may refer to:

- Kevin McKenna (Irish republican), Irish Republican Army chief of staff
- Kevin McKenna (basketball) (born 1959), basketball player
- Kevin McKenna (soccer) (born 1980), retired Canadian soccer player.
- Kevin McKenna (politician), British MP for Sittingbourne and Sheppey
