= St. Johns Review =

Weekly newspaper published in St. Johns, Oregon

- Type: Monthly newspaper
- Owner(s): Richard Colvin
- Founder(s): J.C. Crome
- Editor: Anisha D.B. Scanlon
- Founded: 1904
- Language: English
- Headquarters: 8316 N. Lombard St., #388 Portland, OR 97203
- ISSN: 2163-6869
- OCLC number: 45690627
- Website: stjohnsreview.com

The St. Johns Review is the oldest extant neighborhood newspaper in Portland, Oregon, United States. It is circulated monthly throughout 13 neighborhoods in North Portland.

== History ==
J.C. Crome first published the St. Johns Review on Nov. 11, 1904. The paper was established when St. Johns was still separate town from Portland and had its own city hall. A notice announcing the new title in another paper read:

A bright little weekly came to light the other day, and will hereafter be known as the St. Johns Review. The paper is edited and published by J. C. Crome, and will be devoted to the interests of the Peninsula, the manufacturing center of the Northwest. The Review well deserves the rich success its breezy little pages give evidence of.

— The Hood River Glacier, Nov. 24, 1904, Page 2

In 1905, W. N. Carter bought an interest in the paper from Crome. By 1926 the paper was owned by H. L. Ray, who sold it to Robert Irish for $5,000. Robert and his wife Ellen Irish published the paper until 1973. At its peak in WWII, the Review had a circulation of 7,000.

The weekly newspaper was purchased by Milo Johnson and Don Van Deusen in 1973 after spotting a "for sale" ad in The Oregonian. At the time the paper had a circulation of 5,000. The two men had previously worked as salesmen for a large printing machinery firm. One of the first things the new publisher's did was redesign the paper from its 1930s aesthetic. By 1978, Johnson had sold out and Van Deusen had purchased a second paper, Columbia County Herald. That year Van Deusen put the Review up for sale. The paper had a 2,700 circulation and its tabloid pages ranged from 12 to 20 per weekly Thursday edition.

Tom and Marcia Pry, owners of the Sellwood Bee, bought the Review on March 1, 1979. The couple redesigned the paper's front page to include the famed aches of the St. Johns Bridge. The new owners also moved the paper's office out of 8410 N. Lombard, which it had occupied for 50 years, so the Prys could fix up the property. In 1994, Pry Publishing, which by then owned several Portland community newspapers, was bought by MR Communications, owned by Michael Roeper. Around that time Gayla Patton, publisher of the Hayden Island Connection, happened to pass by the Review's office and bumped into Roeper. Roeper told Patton he was shuttering the paper, and knowing she was interested, offered to sell her the Review for $10. The single mother of two immediately accepted.

After a decade, Patton doubled circulation to 4,000. By 2004, the paper was given out for free at 80 news stands across St. John, with an annual subscription costing $12. Patton ran the paper for 26 years until selling it to Richard Colvin on Dec. 30, 2022. After failing to acquire the paper, Barbara Quinn and Mark Kirchmeier launched a competitor called North Peninsula Review. In June 2024, the St. Johns Review went on hiatus after Colvin was arrested in Alabama for threatening over the phone to rape a 77-year-old woman who worked as a church receptionist. As of July 2024, Colvin was in the process of transferring ownership to the paper's director Anisha Scanlon, who said the paper was $10,000 in debt and needed to raise money on GoFundMe to print its next issue.
