= Michael McKenna =

Michael McKenna may refer to:

- Michael McKenna (bishop) (born 1951), Australian Roman Catholic bishop
- Michael McKenna (Australian footballer) (born 1961), Australian footballer for Footscray and Richmond
- Michael McKenna (Scottish footballer) (born 1991), Scottish footballer for Arbroath and Berwick Rangers
- Michael McKenna (priest) (died 1875), Irish-American prelate with ties to Irish nationalism
- Michael McKenna (Scrabble player), 2012 World Youth Scrabble Champion and world record holder
- Michael McKenna (Shortland Street), a fictional character on the New Zealand soap opera Shortland Street
- Mike McKenna (ice hockey) (born 1983), National Hockey League goaltender
- Mike McKenna (musician) (born 1946), Canadian rock / blues guitarist
