= Justice McKenna (disambiguation) =

Justice McKenna refers to Joseph McKenna (1843–1926), associate justice of the Supreme Court of the United States. Justice McKenna may also refer to:

- Sabrina McKenna (born 1957), associate justice of the Supreme Court of Hawaii
- Thomas F. McKenna (c. 1912–1996), associate justice of the New Mexico Supreme Court

== See also ==
- Judge McKenna (disambiguation)
