= Willie McKenna =

Scottish footballer

Personal information
- Full name: William Crea J. McKenna
- Date of birth: 5 October 1889
- Place of birth: Gorbals, Scotland
- Date of death: 18 April 1958 (aged 68)
- Position: Goalkeeper

Youth career
- Queen's Park

Senior career*
Years	Team	Apps	(Gls)
1907–1908	Queen's Park	17	(0)
1908–1910	Falkirk	25	(0)
1910	Port Glasgow Athletic	7	(0)
1910	Morton	1	(0)
1910–1913	Queen's Park	18	(0)
1914–1915	Clydebank	24	(0)
- * Club domestic league appearances and goals

William Crea J. McKenna (5 October 1889 – 18 April 1958), also known as Billy McKenna, was a Scottish amateur footballer who played as a goalkeeper in the Scottish League for Queen's Park, Falkirk, Port Glasgow Athletic, Morton and Clydebank. He later served on the Queen's Park committee and as club president.

== Personal life ==
McKenna was married with two daughters. He served in the Lanarkshire Yeomanry in India during the First World War, initially as an enlisted man, prior to being commissioned as a second lieutenant in May 1917. Late in the war, he transferred to the Queen Victoria's Own Madras Sappers & Miners. After the war, McKenna worked in the family tailoring business and later served in the Home Guard during the Second World War.

== Career statistics ==
Appearances and goals by club, season and competition
Club	Season	League			Scottish Cup		Other		Total	
Club	Season	Division	Apps	Goals	Apps	Goals	Apps	Goals	Apps	Goals
Queen's Park	1907–08	Scottish First Division	17	0	0	0	1 (Note: Appearance in Glasgow Merchants Charity Cup)	0	18	0
Falkirk	1908–09	Scottish First Division	25	0	4	0	—		29	0
Port Glasgow Athletic	1909–10	Scottish First Division	7	0	1	0	—		8	0
Morton	1909–10	Scottish First Division	1	0	—		—		1	0
Queen's Park	1910–11	Scottish First Division	17	0	2	0	—		19	0
Queen's Park	1911–12	Scottish First Division	1	0	0	0	—		1	0
Queen's Park	Total		35	0	2	0	1	0	38	0
Clydebank	1914–15	Scottish Second Division	24	0	2	0	—		26	0
Career total			92	0	9	0	1	0	102	0
