= St. Johns, Portland, Oregon =

Neighborhood in Portland, Oregon, U.S.

St. Johns
- Neighborhood
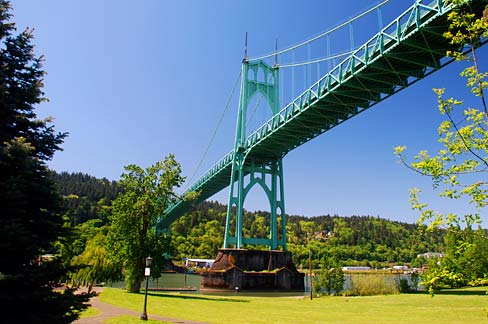
- Location in Portland
- Coordinates: 45°36′45″N 122°45′46″W
- Country: United States
- State: Oregon
- City: Portland

Government
  - Association: St. Johns Neighborhood Association
  - Coalition: Northeast Coalition of Neighborhoods

Area
  - Total: 11.02 sq mi (28.55 km^{2})

Population (2010)
  - Total: 12,207
  - Density: 1,107/sq mi (427.6/km^{2})

Housing
  - No. of households: 5,134
  - Occupancy rate: 93% occupied
  - Home owners: 2,692 (52%)
  - Renters: 2,099 households (41%)
  - Avg. household size: 2.38 persons

St. Johns is a neighborhood of Portland, Oregon, United States, located in North Portland on the tip of the peninsula formed by the confluence of the Willamette River and the Columbia River. The iconic St. Johns Bridge crosses the Willamette from the south, leading into downtown St. Johns. It was a separate, incorporated city from 1903 until 1915, when citizens of both St. Johns and Portland voted to approve its annexation to Portland, which took effect on July 8, 1915.

St. Johns is bordered by the Columbia River to the northeast, the Willamette River to the northwest, the North Portland railroad cut to the southeast, and a number of streets separating it from Cathedral Park to the southwest, primarily North Ivanhoe Street.

== History ==
Historian Eva Emery Dye, while looking at the original Lewis and Clark Expedition journals, made the discovery that William Clark made camp at the modern site of Cathedral Park near a Native American settlement for one night.

St. Johns is named in honor of settler James John. He made his journey to the Pacific Northwest from Westport, Missouri in 1841. His first residence was in Linnton, Oregon before moving across the river no earlier than 1844. Five years after John's settlement, nearly 12 families laid claim to land in the vicinity. In 1865, John had a portion of his land surveyed and plotted into eight blocks for a townsite. Additional blocks were added in 1870 and 1876. John would often donate small parcels of his land to his friends without means. After his death, James John left his remaining personal property to the township of St. Johns to use to build a public school. It was John's wish that children of all religious denominations could study together and receive an education that stressed the importance of civic engagement. John requested that all of his assets be sold off to raise funds for first his burial and funeral and the remainder to building the new school house.

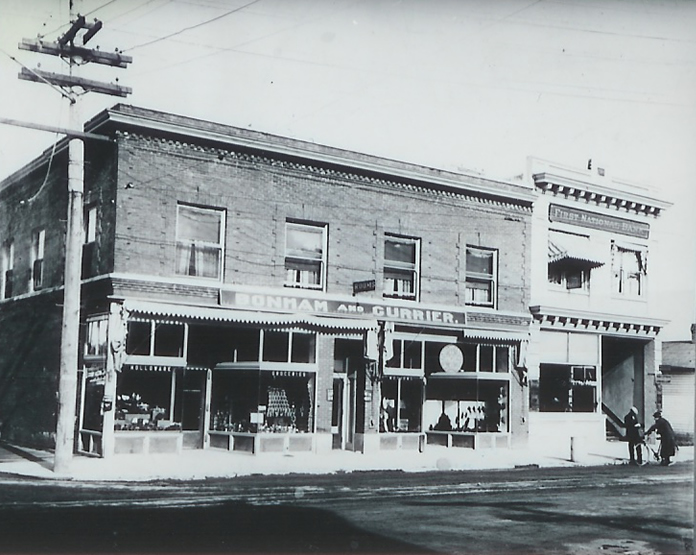
The Bonham and Currier (left) and First National Bank buildings (right) in 1908

B. O. Severance of Maine erected a saw mill in St. Johns during the late 1860s, making it the first established industry in the townsite. After bankruptcy, the building was sold and converted into a barrel manufacturing plant for the sugar trade. After bags became common for sugar transport, the barrel company was forced out of business. The building was again sold, this time to the Central Lumber Company. According to The Oregonian, the first electric sawmill in the United States was constructed in St. Johns by M. B. Rankin of the Electric Sawmill company in 1903. After the building's erection the owners changed hands and production went dormant. The saw itself was a success, but the financiers of the mill failed to keep up a steady output of lumber.

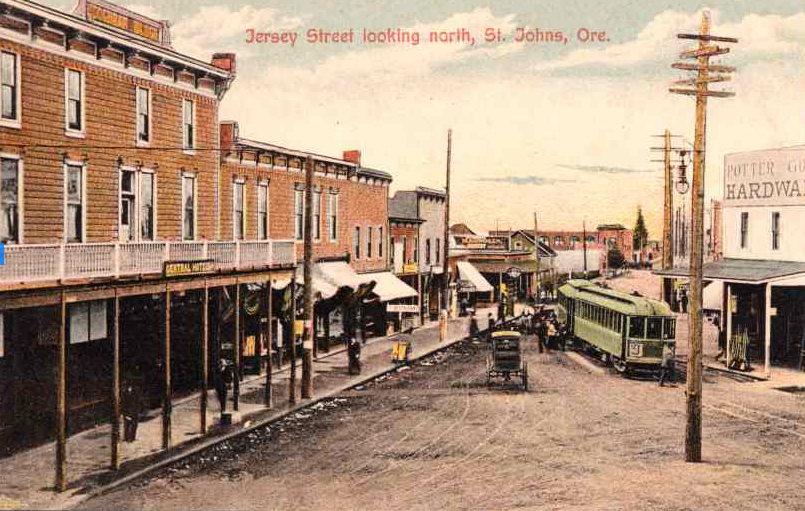
A postcard featuring Jersey Street in St. Johns.

In 1902, the Oregon Railroad and Navigation Company built a new line along the harbor. After the railway was completed, several businesses flocked to St. Johns, the first being the Portland Manufacturing Plant.

St. Johns was officially recognized as a municipality by the Oregon State Legislature on February 19, 1903. Early citizens tasked with incorporation of their small town formed a new school district and petitioned the county court for a vote of approval. In 1904, the St. Johns Civic Improvement League was established to help the infant city catch up with the more established sites along the Willamette River. For almost two years after the town was established the streets remained unnamed and houses went unnumbered, making postal service impossible.

The electric streetcar line in St. Johns connecting the town to Albina and Portland was petitioned in 1902 by the University Park Board of Trade. Passengers were forced to board a steam streetcar at Killingsworth and Williams if they wanted to travel to the peninsula. Work began to electrify the line in June 1902.

The St. Johns Shipbuilding Plant was established in 1904 with US$10,000 in capital.

The St. Johns Library opened in 1907 after years of community interest in a reading room. T. J. Monahan was the president of the library committee during its construction. Upon its completion, the Portland Library donated 200 books to the new establishment.

=== Politics and laws ===
On March 18, 1903, the town held its first elections. The town elected Charles A. Cook, a telegraph operator, to be its first mayor. A real estate office was used for the polling place where 134 citizens voted. The town's population at the time of its incorporation was roughly 250 to 600 people. In two years the population swelled to 2,000.

In 1903, the St. Johns City Council approved an ordinance taxing dancehalls $10 a day, making it virtually impossible for someone to run such a business within town limits. It was seen by the councilors and Mayor Charles A. Cook as a way to keep the town moral. Along the same lines, the city council refused to approve saloon licences, even after potential proprietors vowed to keep gamblers and hard liquor away.

Citizens petitioned the St. Johns City Council in 1904 to regulate the roaming of cattle within the town's limits in order to protect small gardens from being destroyed.

When Mayor Fred W. Valentine appointed himself postmaster during a controversial decision in 1906 he subsequently ousted A. S. Clark who had served that post in an unofficial capacity for years. She was offered an assistant postmaster position, but declined. Weeks after Valentine's self-appointment, he resigned the mayor's office in the face of impeachment. B. W. Hinman was selected in a special election to replace Valentine.

In 1915, voters in St. Johns decided to give up their charter and merge with the City of Portland, its neighbor since the 1891 annexation of Albina.

==== St. Johns City Hall ====
By 1905, the St. Johns City Council was planning to build a new city hall building. In January 1906, amidst financial woes, the city was facing the prospect of selling off the land on which they had intended to erect a new municipal building. The land was purchased from Charles Olhouse for $3,500. By January, with one month remaining on the payment deadline, the council had only put up $200. This forced M. L. Holbrook to pay $2,000 and W. M. Killingsworth to put another $1,000 behind the project, with the promise that it would be returned in due time. One member of the city council who was adamant in his disapproval of the proposed city hall was S. C. Norton, who claimed the council was purposely misleading the public and acting against their will. Norton claimed that the proposed $10,000 to build a new city hall was a made-up figure. Ultimately a $7,953 contract was granted to Youngferdorf & Son, who would be responsible for the building of the foundation, outside and inside walls, roof, gas piping, and rough flooring.

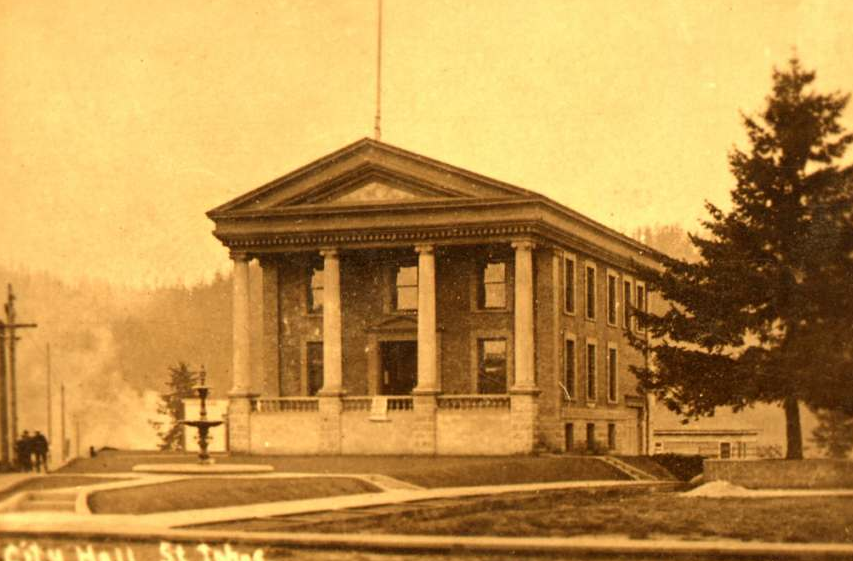
St. Johns City Hall was built in 1907 and is currently used by the Portland Police Bureau.

The city hall contract was to be completed in just two months, November and December 1906. But Youngferdorf & Son failed to meet the deadline, causing the city to step in and take over the operation. The contractors were paid just $2,000, with $800 worth of work to still be done on the building. This alarmed Councilman Norton, who claimed there was a "conspiracy" afoot, and hoped to get to the bottom of it. S. C. Norton sharply questioned City Recorder Thorndyke about the haste placed on the construction of the building. He and City Attorney Green, as well as Councilman W. H. King, felt that Norton was grasping at straws.

The building's architect, W. W. Goodrich, explained in a letter to the council that the contract was not completed due to poor weather and failed shipments. Eventually, Norton won the favor of Mayor Hinman, who called for the contract be restored to Youngferdorf & Son. A week later the architect was dead. His son took over the project and took on Norton and other council members who were growing weary of the project. At his first city council meetings, Goodrich stated that councilmen who claimed "the material in the city hall is of poor quality". Norton and Hewitt called Goodrich's claims false and objected to them being put on the record.

It was scheduled to be completed and ready for use by July 1, 1907. The two-story brick building on concrete foundation had offices for the mayor, city recorder, city attorney, chief of police and the fire department as well as a gymnasium and a records room on the first floor. The second floor had the council's chambers and smaller rooms to be used as committee and jury rooms.

=== Race and culture ===
In February 1910, a Hindu laborer was arrested for allegedly starting a fire at the Portland Manufacturing Plant, costing the company $100,000 in damages. This heightened tensions between Whites and the heavily outnumbered Indian immigrants. White laborers felt their jobs were being compromised by low-cost labor, but factory owners claimed white workers would not agree to do the jobs that the Indian workers took for lower wages. On March 21, 1910, a riot occurred after a white laborer threw a glass of beer at an Indian worker. The Oregonian reported that a mob formed almost immediately outside of the saloon. From there, the mob marched to the homes of the Indian immigrants, broke into their homes, and threw them out to the mob. In one instance, an Indian man was thrown from a two-story window. The fall broke his ankle. Others were violently beaten in the streets, placed on streetcars, and sent off to Portland. Their homes were looted and vandalized. Members of the mob included prominent members of the town, including police officer G. W. Dunbar.

St. Johns has historically been a blue collar neighborhood known for its diversity. According to 2019 estimates by the U.S. Census Bureau, St. Johns's ZIP code, 97203, which is shared with other neighborhoods, is about 63% non-Hispanic white, compared with about 71% for Portland as a whole. With 23.5% of the residents in the ZIP code living at or below the poverty line, the neighborhood is one of the city's poorest.

As of the 2010s, new development has made St. Johns one of the most rapidly developing parts of Portland. Many of the long-time residents of North Portland struggle with displacement due to the increased cost of living.

=== Transportation ===
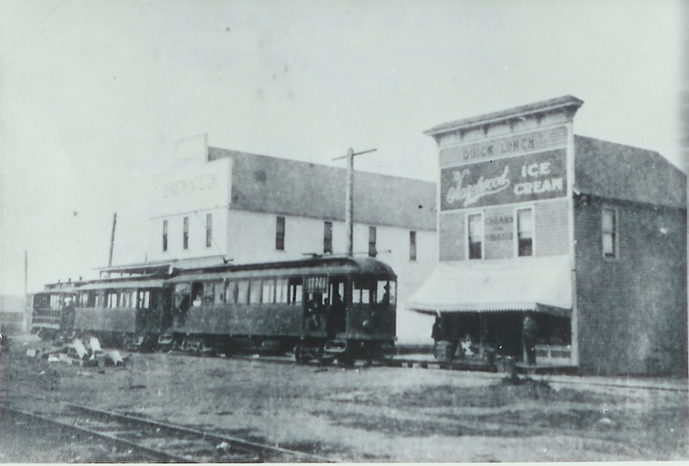
The electric streetcar on Dawson Street (now North Lombard Street).

The Oregon Railroad and Navigation Company (O. R. & N.) sent out surveys to assess a new project for St. Johns, Oregon in May 1901. At this time, the town was an unincorporated settlement with several farms and few roads. The rail construction was the first of its kind in the area and was planned for the purposes of transporting goods to several industries that had sprouted around St. Johns. The location was selected for the 5.5 miles of track, which would be placed on John Mock's property by Swan Island and curve around Portland University. O. R. & N. subcontracted to the Kilpatrick Bros. & Collins firm of Nebraska to help them lay their new line. Its construction was completed in 1902.

An extension to the City & Suburban Rail Company's line in North Albina to St. Johns was announced. The company built double tracks of steam trains that would stop at Ockley Green Station where electric cars would take over to Albina and eventually Portland. Set to begin in July 1903, the St. Johns Railroad Company announced that they would construct an electric streetcar line from St. Johns to North Albina. A year before, Portland's City & Suburban Rail Company electrified their passenger lines to St. Johns. Before that, the town was somewhat isolated from Portland. The steam passenger cars were available, but the route was roundabout and proved inefficient. After the installation of the streetcar, travel time to the rural town was slashed and the population and number of industries steadily increased over the next years.

Francis I. McKenna, the head of the company building the electric line, was a prominent citizen of University Park involved in the City Beautiful movement. McKenna made his fortune in real estate, but branched out into anything he felt bettered his community. A direct line to Portland still was not available as passengers had to transfer at Piedmont Junction in Albina. The St. Johns Commercial Association petitioned the Portland Consolidated Railway Company to install a transfer-free line to St. Johns and to increase to a twenty-minute schedule in February 1905. Just weeks later the streetcar manager wrote a letter to the association announcing a new through service line to Portland without transfer. In May it was learned that only half of the association's demands would be met as the Portland Consolidated Railway Company kept their old thirty-minute schedule. The change was much needed, as the start of the Lewis and Clark Centennial Exposition was expected to bring fair-goers to the town.

Under the oversight of Mayor Kindel C. Couch, the town of St. Johns spent an unprecedented amount on infrastructure in 1911. Over $50 for every resident was spent on paving streets and sidewalks, and constructing sewers. To do this, the city government leaned on businesses to increase their workforce so more people would be paying taxes, buying homes and spending at local shops. This worked as the Portland Woolen Mills, which was located near the waterfront, increased their gross payroll from $7,500 to $15,000 a month while employing a total of 300 workers on day and night shifts. The second most profitable payroll in the town was the St. Johns Lumber company with $14,000 a month going to workers who in some cases had to take on overtime to keep up with demand.

== Public schools ==
Public schools in St. Johns are part of Portland Public Schools and include Roosevelt High School, George Middle School, Sitton Elementary School, and James John Elementary School, and the neighborhood is also served by Faubion School and Jefferson High School. The northernmost tip of the neighborhood is part of the Scappoose School District, though there are no residences in that region.

== Industry ==
The downtown business core of St. Johns consists primarily of boutique shops and individually owned and operated restaurants, including two theater pubs. The northern portion of the neighborhood gives way to a vast industrial landscape of warehouses, parking lots, and cargo and shipping facilities, including the 11 km^{2} Rivergate Industrial District of the Port of Portland.

== Natural areas ==
St. Johns and North Portland are known for their proximity to natural habitats. There are many parks and natural areas in St. Johns, including Pier Park, the Columbia Slough, Kelley Point Park (1984), Pier Park (1959), the Smith and Bybee Wetlands Natural Area (1961), not to mention that it is near Cathedral Park and Baltimore Woods in the Cathedral Park Neighborhood and right across the river from Forest Park. Upon entering St. Johns there is a conspicuously placed sign in the traffic median which says, "Welcome to the Peninsula, Gateway to Nature". Sightings of bald eagles and other birds of prey are common.

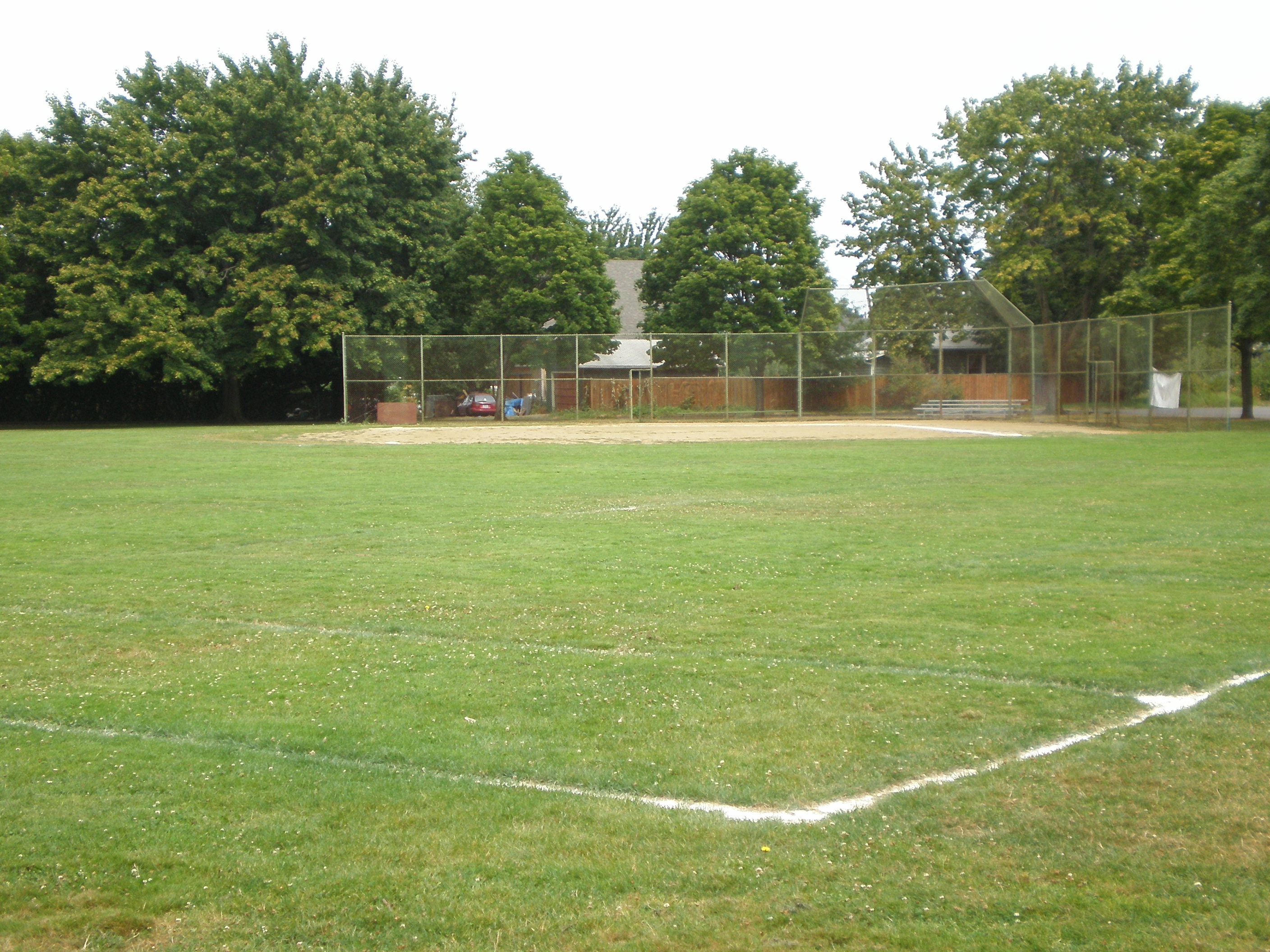
St. Johns Park

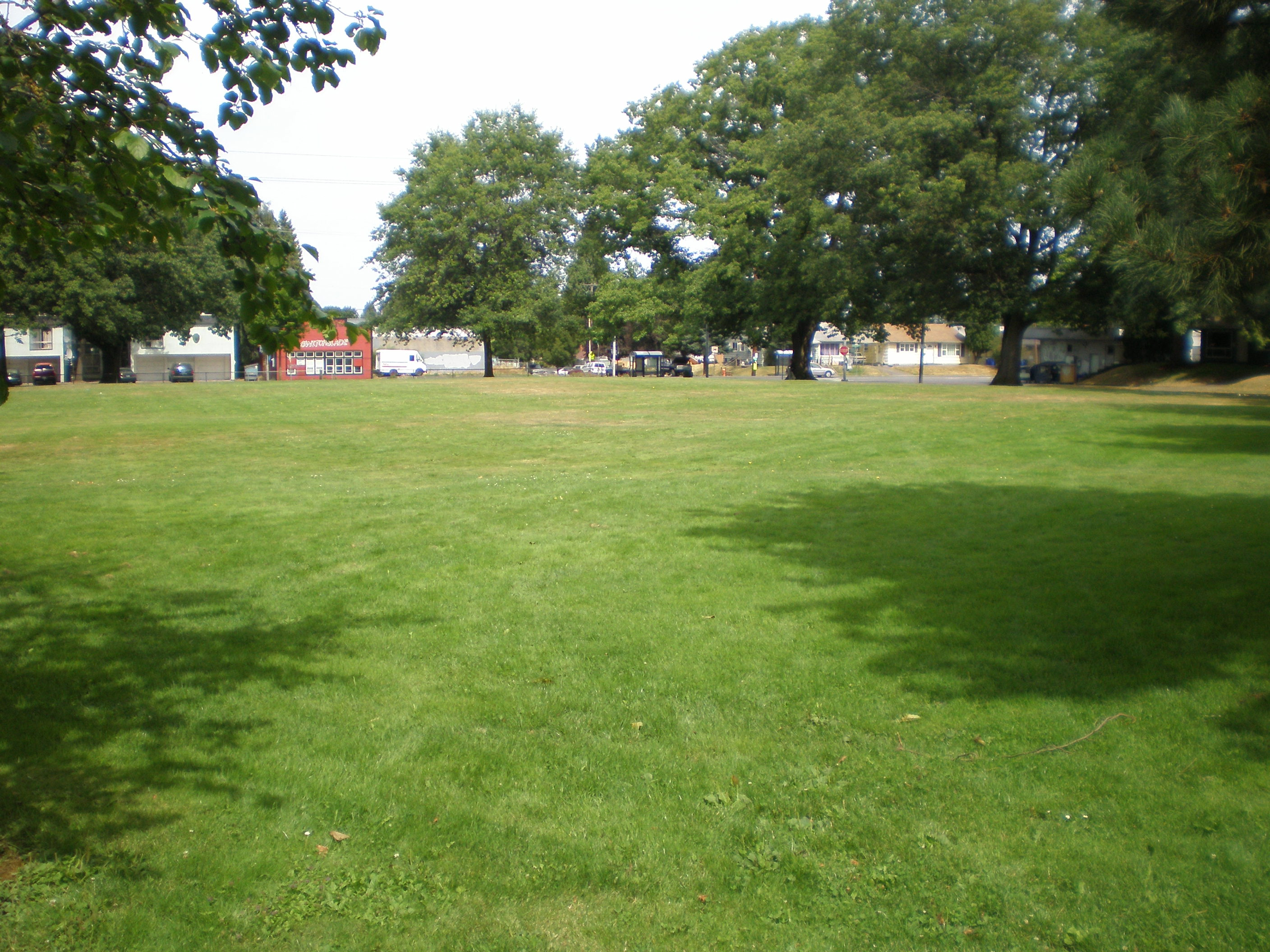
George Park

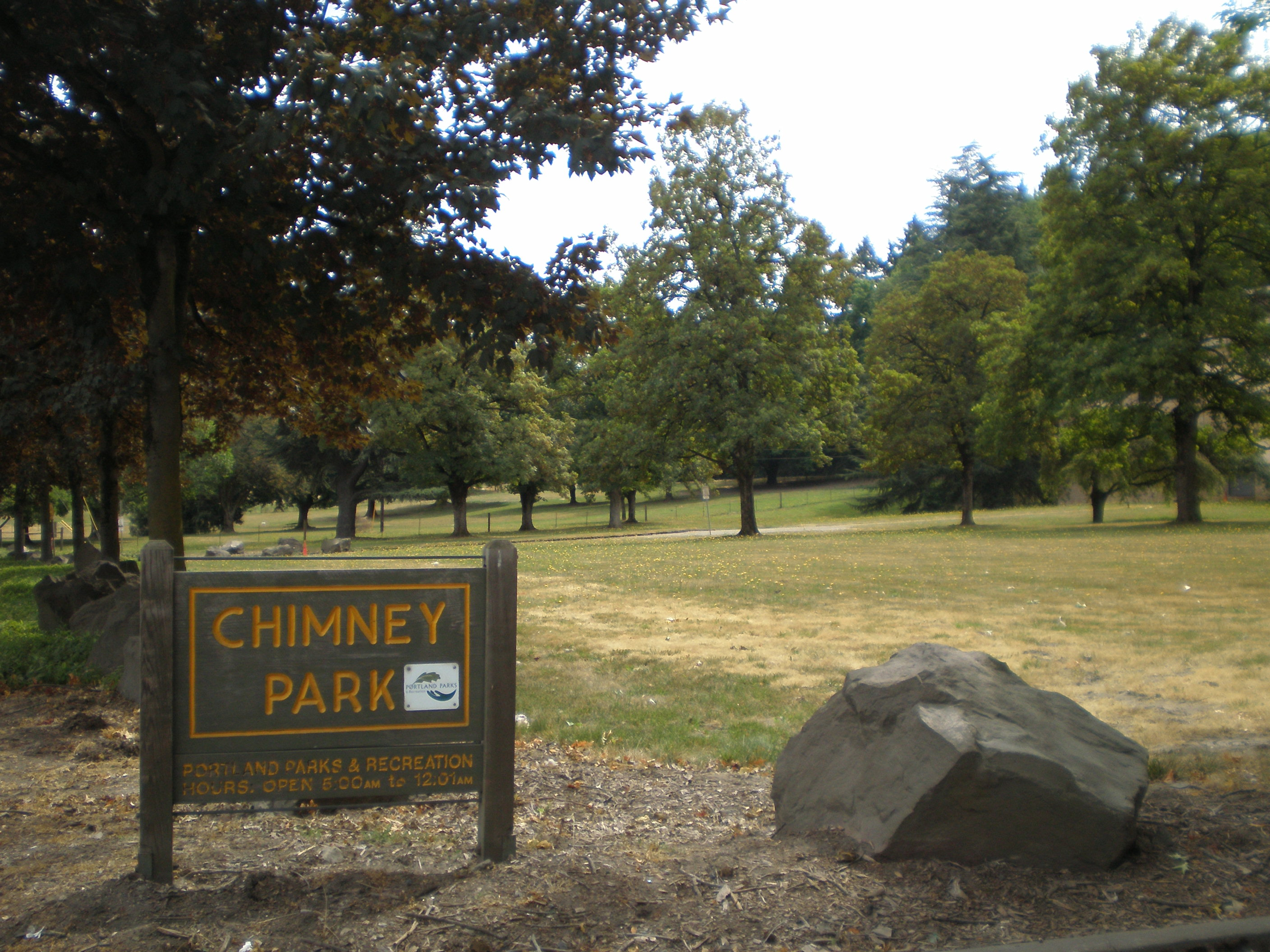
Chimney Park

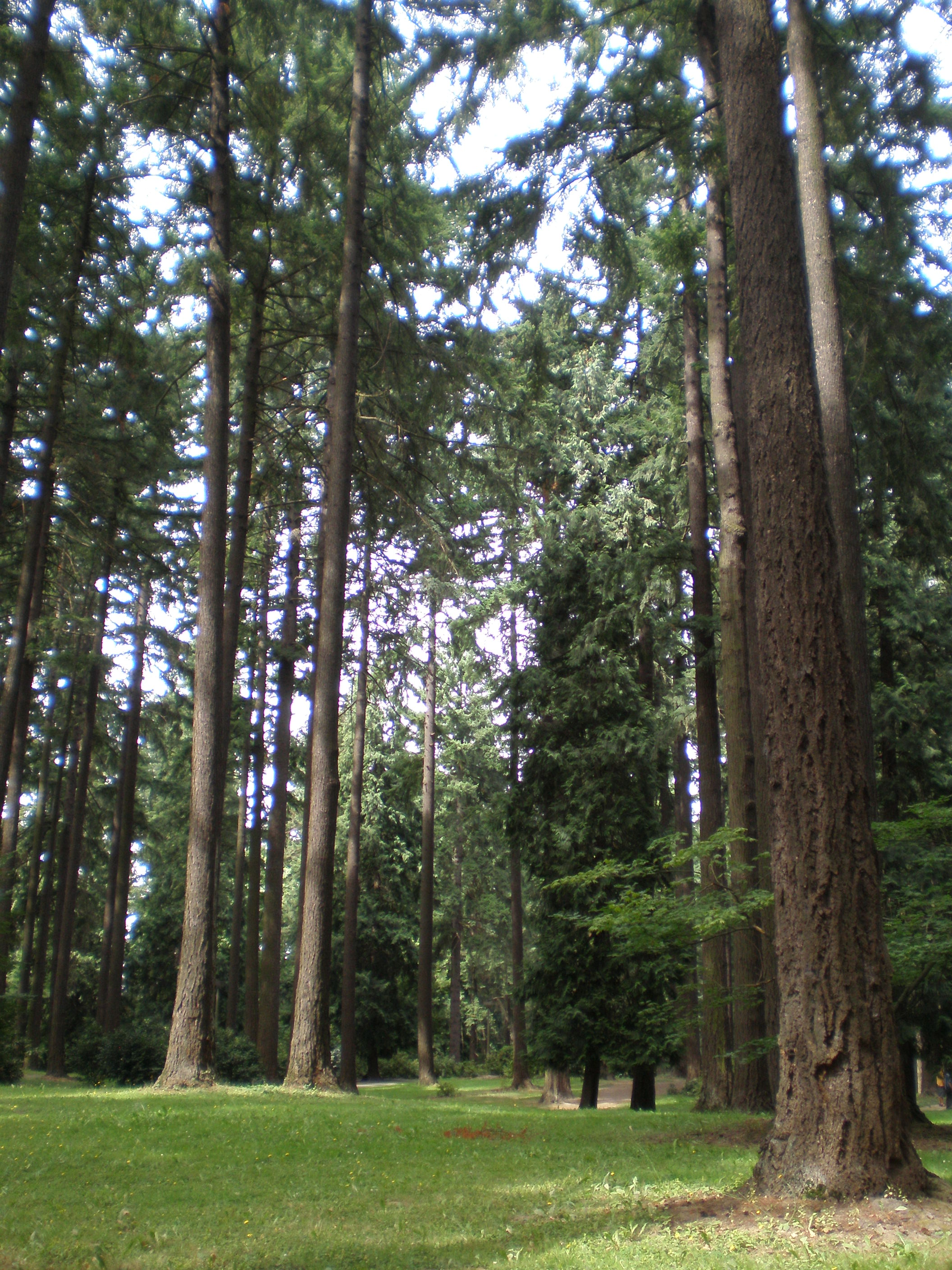
Pier Park

== See also ==
- James John High School
- National Cash Register Building
- St. Johns Post Office
- St. Johns Review
- St. Johns Twin Cinema
