= Ryan McKenna (politician) =

American politician (born 1973)

Ryan Glennon McKenna
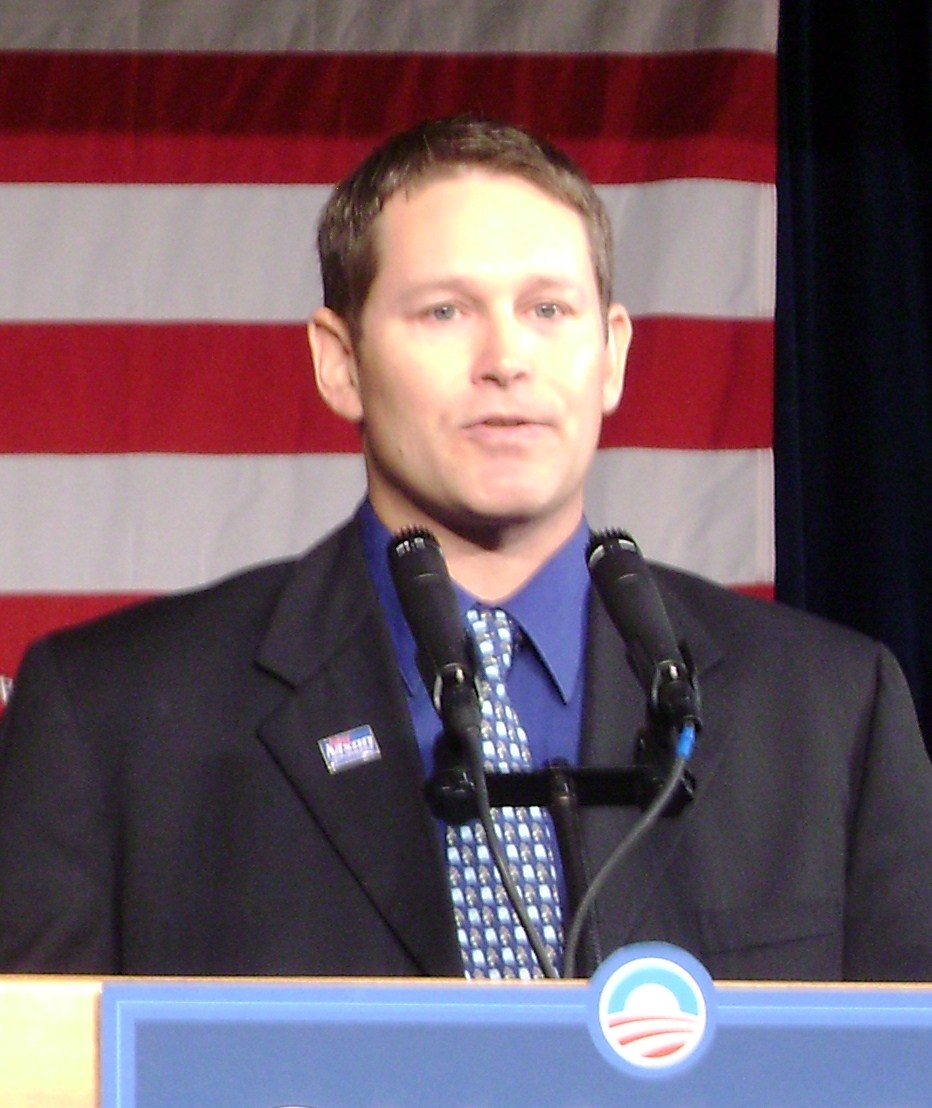

Member of the Missouri Senate from the 22nd district
- In office 2007–2014

Member of the Missouri House of Representatives from the 102 district
- In office 1999–2006

Personal details
- Born: April 27, 1973 (age 53) Barnhart, Missouri, U.S.
- Party: Democratic
- Children: 3
- Education: Southwest Missouri State University

Ryan Glennon McKenna (born April 27, 1973) is an American politician who served as a Democratic member of the Missouri Senate, representing the 22nd District from 2007 to 2014. He was a previously member of the Missouri House of Representatives from 1999 through 2006.

McKenna has lived in Jefferson County, Missouri his entire life. He graduated from St. Pius X High School in the Twin City area and went on to attend Jefferson College, playing on their State Championship baseball team in 1993. He graduated from Missouri State University (formerly Southwest Missouri State University) in 1996, where he received a Bachelor of Science degree in education.

McKenna's father is William McKenna, who served as a member of both chambers of the Missouri General Assembly.
