= William McKenna (politician) =

American politician

Member of the Missouri Senate from the 22nd district
- In office April 7, 1993 – January 3, 1999
- Preceded by: Jay Nixon
- Succeeded by: Steve Stoll

Member of the Missouri House of Representatives from the 102nd district
- In office January 6, 1993 – April 7, 1993
- Preceded by: Joseph L. Treadway
- Succeeded by: David W. Broach

Member of the Missouri House of Representatives from the 105th district
- In office January 5, 1983 – January 6, 1993
- Preceded by: Philip M. Barry
- Succeeded by: Jo Ann Karll

Personal details
- Born: August 29, 1946 (age 79)
- Party: Democratic
- Education: Southeast Missouri State University

William "Bill" McKenna (born August 29, 1946) is an American Democratic politician who served in the Missouri Senate and the Missouri House of Representatives from 1983 to 1993.

== Biography ==
Born in St. Louis, Missouri, McKenna graduated from St. Louis University High School and earned a Bachelor of Arts degree in education from Southeast Missouri State University. He served in the United States Army Reserve from 1968 until 1974.

His son Ryan McKenna also served in the Missouri Senate and the Missouri House of Representatives, while his father J. Glennon McKenna served in the Missouri House of Representatives in the 1940s.
