= O'Keefe =

O'Keefe/O'Keeffe is an Irish surname, from the (Irish:caomh meaning 'beautiful').

The surname is related to a number of Irish surnames, from O'Caomhain meaning ('son of Kevin'), more commonly anglicized as Kavanagh. The surname Kevin, is associated with Mag Dhuibhfhinn meaning ('Dark Finn'), hence the surname Finn.

The second is from Ó Geibheannaigh, anglicized as Keaveney, MacGeaveny and Geaney, now Kenny.

Other related names include Caomhánach, Mag Dhuibhín, McKevin, McKinnon, MacKenzie, Quinn, Kennedy, McKenna, Kennan and Gannon.

== People with the surname ==
- Andrew O'Keefe (born 1971), Australian TV personality
- Arthur J. O'Keefe (1876–1943) American banker and mayor of New Orleans
- Brian O'Keefe (baseball) (born 1993), American baseball player
- Dan O'Keefe (born 1929), a former member of the California state Senate
- Daniel O'Keefe (1928–2012), editor and author, original inventor of Festivus
- Daniel J. O'Keefe (born 1950), American communication and argumentation theory scholar
- Danny O'Keefe (born 1943), American singer-songwriter based in Seattle, Washington
- David Dean O'Keefe (born circa 1824 or 1828, died 1901), Irishman who created stone money and became the virtual king of the island of Yap
- Dennis O'Keefe (1908–1968), American film actor
- Dennis O'Keefe, the mayor of St. John's, Newfoundland, Canada
- Derrick O'Keefe (born 1977), Canadian progressive writer, political activist and blogger
- Eamonn O'Keefe (born 1953), English-born Irish former professional footballer
- Eric O'Keefe (born 1961), American author, editor, and journalist
- Eugene O'Keefe (1827–1913) founder of the O'Keefe Brewery in Toronto
- Frank O'Keefe (1912–1989), Australian politician
- Frank O'Keefe (footballer) (1898–1958), Australian footballer
- Gerald Francis O'Keefe (1917–2000), Catholic bishop of Davenport, Iowa, USA
- James O'Keefe (born 1984), American conservative videographer
- Jodi Lyn O'Keefe (born 1978), American actress and model
- Jeremiah Joseph O'Keefe (1923–2016), American politician
- Jeremiah Joseph O'Keefe IV (1946–2007), American politician
- John O'Keefe (neuroscientist), American-British neuroscientist and Nobel laureate
- Johnny O'Keefe (1935–1978), Australian rock and roll singer
- Joseph "Specs" O'Keefe, one of the participants in the Great Brinks Robbery
- Ken O'Keefe (born 1953), American college football coach
- Kerin O'Keefe (fl. 2000s–2020s), American wine critic and author
- Laurence O'Keefe (disambiguation)
- Marcy O'Keefe (born 1955), American tennis player
- Mark O'Keefe (politician) (born 1952), American politician
- Michael A. O'Keefe (born 1942), Australian-American physicist
- Michael O'Keefe, (born 1955), American film and television actor
- Michael O'Keefe (Louisiana politician) (1931–2021), American politician; convicted felon
- Molly O'Keefe (fl. 2000s–2020s), American author
- Neil O'Keefe (born 1947), retired Australian politician and lobbyist
- Peggy O'Keefe (1928–2019) Australian-Scottish musical artist
- Phil O'Keefe (1948–2020), British geographer and development specialist
- Ryan O'Keefe (born 1981), Australian Football League player
- Sean O'Keefe (born 1956), Chancellor of Louisiana State University, former NASA administrator and aerospace industry executive
- Steve O'Keefe (born 1984), Australian cricketer and current New South Wales player
- Richard O'Keefe (fl. 1990s), computer scientist
- Thomas O'Keefe (born 1964), American musician known for his work in the group Antiseen
- Walter O'Keefe (1900–1983), American songwriter, actor and syndicated columnist

== See also ==
- Carling O'Keefe, a brewing conglomerate in Canada
