= Willie E. Gary =

American lawyer (born 1947)

- Born: Willie Edward Gary; July 12, 1947 (age 79); Eastman, Georgia, U.S.
- Education: Shaw University; North Carolina Central University School of Law (JD)
- Occupation: Lawyer
- Spouse: Gloria Gary
- Children: 6
- Parent(s): Turner Gary; Mary Gary

Willie E. Gary (born July 12, 1947) is an American trial lawyer, entrepreneur, and philanthropist who won multi-million-dollar verdicts against some of the largest corporations in the United States. Gary and his wife Gloria established Martin County's first Black law firm at the age of 27, presently known as, Gary, Williams, Parenti, Watson, Gary & Gillespie, P.L.L.C. Gary’s career includes landmark cases such as the 1995 Loewen Group funeral-home lawsuit, which resulted in a US $500 million jury verdict, and a 2000 case against The Walt Disney Company that led to a US $240 million award for misappropriation of a sports-complex concept. Gary was portrayed by actor Jamie Foxx in the 2023 film The Burial.

== Early life and education ==
Born Willie Edward Gary on July 12, 1947, in Eastman, GA, he is one of eleven children of Turner, a sharecropper, and Mary Gary. With his father's backing, Gary attended school two half-days a week, farming with his family the other three days. At 13, Gary supported his family by establishing a lawn service. Gary was the first in his family to graduate from college. He attended Shaw University in Raleigh, North Carolina, on a football scholarship graduating with a Bachelor's degree in business-administration in 1971. In 1974 Gary earned his Juris Doctor degree from North Carolina Central University School of Law.

== Career ==
In 1995, Gary filed a lawsuit on behalf of Mississippi funeral home operator Jeremiah Joseph O'Keefe against Canadian businessman Raymond Loewen after Loewen reneged on a contractual agreement with O'Keefe. Gary won the case, with a jury awarding O'Keefe $500 million in punitive damages; although the case was settled afterward for $175 million, Gary's victory would eventually lead Loewen to resign from his firm, which later would be reorganized after a bankruptcy filing and be sold to a competitor, Service Corporation International. The Loewen funeral company case formed the basis of the 2023 movie The Burial starring Jamie Foxx and Tommy Lee Jones.

In 2000, Gary won a $240 million verdict against Disney for stealing the concept of the ESPN Wide World of Sports Complex.

In 2019, a Florida jury awarded US $23 billion in punitive damages to the family of Michael Johnson in a case Gary tried against R.J. Reynolds Tobacco Company was overturned on appeal. The case stemmed from the death of Michael Johnson of Escambia County, Florida in 1996, who died from lung cancer.

== Memberships ==
Gary is a member of the American Bar Association, The Florida Bar, National Bar Association, and NAACP. Through these affiliations, he has supported initiatives aimed at increasing diversity and access to justice within the U.S. legal system.

== Awards and honors ==
In 2003, the General Assembly of the State of South Carolina recognized him as one of the United States’ most respected and accomplished lawyers.

In 2019, the American Bar Association awarded him the Spirit of Excellence award at a ceremony held at Caesar’s Palace in Las Vegas honoring his career achievements and contributions to promoting diversity in the legal profession.

He is also a recipient of the Horatio Alger Award for overcoming adversity and achieving success through perseverance and philanthropy.

== Personal life ==
He is married to Gloria Gary and has six children, including: Kenneth, Sekou, Kobe, and Ali.

He and his family have been involved in numerous philanthropic and community initiatives across Florida and the southeastern United States.
