= Charles Pringle =

Charles Pringle may refer to:

- Charlie Pringle (1894–1966), Scottish footballer
- Charles Kistner Pringle (1931–2024), American politician, member of the Mississippi House of Representatives
- Charlie Pringle, a character on the children's TV series Postman Pat
