= Daniel O'Keefe =

Daniel O'Keefe may refer to:

- Daniel J. O'Keefe (born 1950), communications scholar and professor
- Daniel O'Keefe (writer) (1928–2012), editor and author who invented Festivus
- Danny O'Keefe (born 1943), American singer-songwriter

== See also ==
- Dan O'Keefe (disambiguation)
- Daniel O'Keeffe (disambiguation)
