= Raymond Loewen =

Canadian businessperson

Raymond L. "Ray" Loewen (born June 27, 1940) is a Canadian businessman, best known as the former owner of Loewen Funeral Group. Loewen also had a brief political career, serving as an MLA in British Columbia in the late 1970s.

== Early life ==
Loewen was born into a prominent Mennonite family in Steinbach, Manitoba in 1940. His uncle founded Loewen Windows, while his father, Abraham Loewen, founded the Loewen Funeral Chapel in Steinbach in 1931, the first funeral home in southeastern Manitoba. Loewen attended high school at Steinbach Collegiate Institute, playing hockey and football and after high school completed a theology degree at Briercrest Bible College in Saskatchewan. In 1962, Loewen married Anne Heinrichs in Saskatchewan and returned to Steinbach.

Upon Loewen's return to Steinbach, his father became ill, and Loewen took over the family funeral chapel and immediately fired his own brothers from the company. He ran Loewen Funeral Chapel in Steinbach for five years, before moving to Fort Frances, Ontario in 1967 and ultimately Burnaby, British Columbia in 1969 where he purchased two more funeral homes. At that time, he also became involved in real estate and transportation. The original Loewen Funeral home in Steinbach burned to the ground in 1976 and was later rebuilt at a different location. A cairn in Steinbach commemorates the spot of this original funeral home.

== Political career ==
In 1975, Loewen ran for office in the Legislative Assembly of British Columbia. He won the election and represented Burnaby-Edmonds from 1975 to 1979 as a Social Credit MLA.

== The Loewen Group ==
=== Growth of the Loewen Group ===
As of the early 1980s, Loewen owned a small handful of funeral parlours, including the original location in Steinbach and several in British Columbia, with Loewen mostly focusing on other real estate investments. After Loewen's brief political career and downturn in the BC real estate market in the early 1980s, however, he refocused on the funeral business, establishing the Loewen Group and purchasing 45 funeral homes in western Canada. In 1985 Loewen Group went public and, in 1987, the company expanded into the United States. In the years that followed, Loewen rapidly expanded his company, purchasing hundreds of small independent funeral homes. By the mid-90s, the company had 15,000 employees and operated 1,115 funeral homes and was the world's second-largest funeral chain.

=== O'Keefe lawsuit ===
In 1995, Jeremiah O'Keefe, a funeral home operator in Mississippi represented by Willie E. Gary sued the Loewen Group in a breach of contract suit. In the trial Gary emphasized Loewen's lavish lifestyle, including the ownership of a yacht, and The Loewen Group's agreement with the National Baptist Convention.

Jurors concluded from internal Loewen memos and other evidence that the deal, never completed, had just been a ploy to string Mr. O'Keefe along while keeping him out of the funeral markets Loewen was seeking to dominate.

The defense introduced testimony about a deal Mr. Loewen had with the black National Baptist Convention to buy their graveyards and employ thousands of black church workers as agents to sell Loewen burial contracts. The move backfired when the jury learned that unlike Mr. Loewen's deals with whites, the contracts did not include services like embalming and viewing at Loewen-affiliated funeral homes.

The jury awarded O'Keefe $500 million and, unable to afford an appeal, Loewen settled with O'Keefe for $175 million.

=== Downfall of the Loewen Group ===
The large amount of punitive damages awarded in the O'Keefe lawsuit was criticized by some legal experts, but Loewen was unable to appeal, and this setback led to a significant downturn in the company's fortunes. After the O'Keefe verdict in 1995, Loewen remained CEO of the Loewen Group until 1998, when he sold his shares in the company.

The Loewen Group filed for bankruptcy protection in 1999 and, in 2002, it was restructured as the Alderwoods Group. In 2006, Alderwoods board of directors sold Alderwoods to Service Corporation International (SCI), an American funeral corporation.

In 2008, Loewen's Twin Cedars estate in Burnaby, British Columbia, was listed for sale at C$25 million, and was sold June 2012 for C$9.948 million.

== Legacy ==
Ray Loewen was portrayed by actor Bill Camp in the 2023 legal drama film The Burial about the O'Keefe case. After the release of the film The Burial, Loewen was the subject of a spoof on the Mennonite satire website The Unger Review.
