= Bill Camp =

American actor (born 1963/1964)

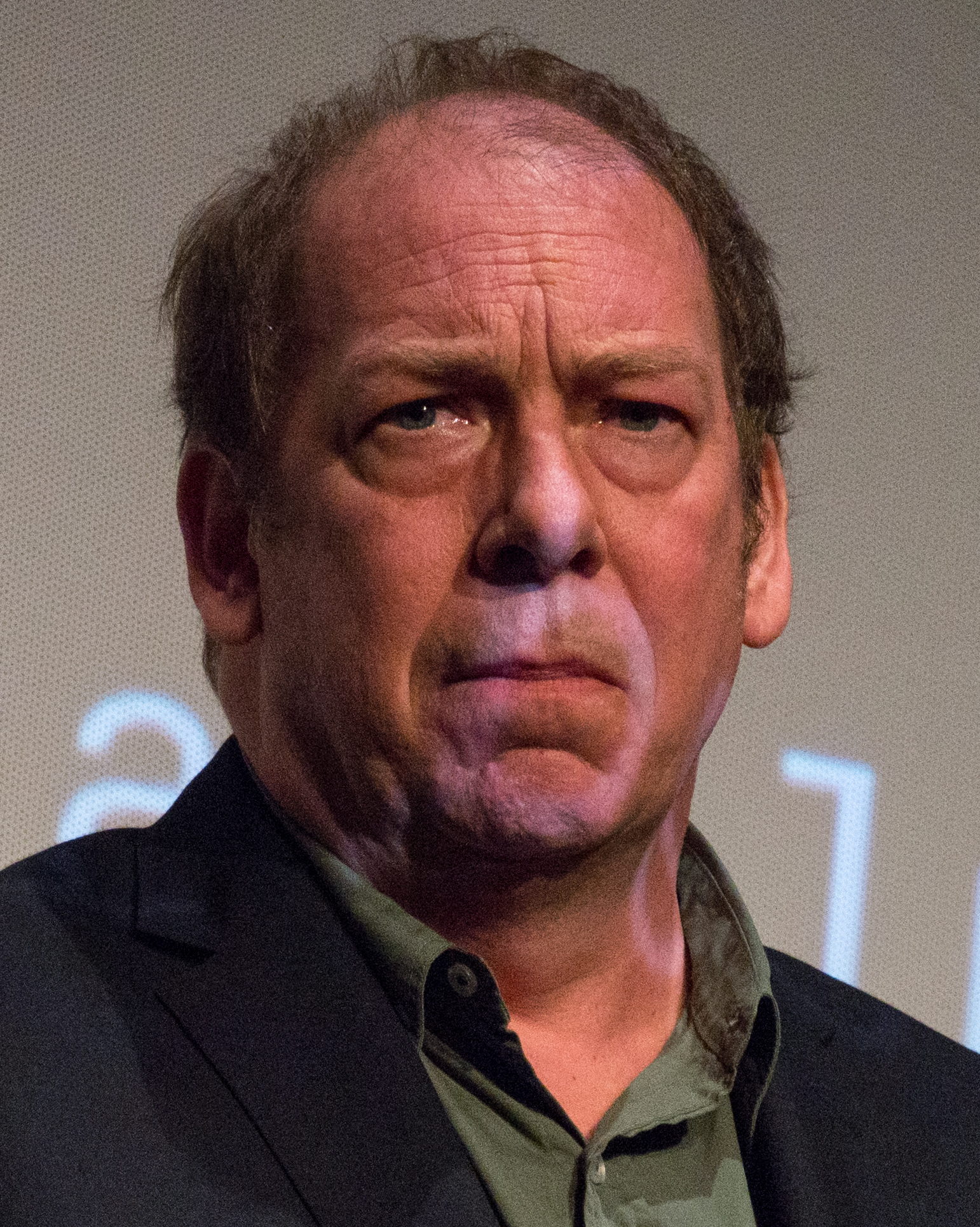
- Camp in 2018
- Born: 1963 or 1964 (age 61–62); Massachusetts, U.S.
- Education: Juilliard School
- Occupation: Actor
- Years active: 1989–present
- Spouse: Elizabeth Marvel (m. 2004)
- Children: 1

Bill Camp (born 1963 or 1964) is an American actor. He has played supporting roles in many films such as Lincoln (2012), Compliance (2012), Lawless (2012), 12 Years a Slave (2013), Love & Mercy (2015), Loving (2016), Molly's Game (2017), Vice (2018), Wildlife (2018), Joker (2019), News of the World (2021), and Sound of Freedom (2023); the HBO miniseries The Night Of in 2016 and The Outsider in 2020; and the Netflix miniseries The Queen's Gambit in 2020. He had a recurring role in the HBO drama series The Leftovers from 2015 to 2017 and the Hulu space drama series The First in 2018.

Camp has appeared in many television series and received two Primetime Emmy Award nominations for his role in The Night Of and for the legal thriller series Presumed Innocent (2024). He was nominated for a Tony Award for his role in the 2016 Broadway revival of the play The Crucible.

== Early life ==
Camp was born in Massachusetts and grew up in Groton, the son of Patricia L., a librarian, and Peter B. Camp, who was an assistant headmaster at the Groton School. He attended the University of Vermont but left without a degree, later graduating from the Juilliard School.

== Career ==
=== Theatre ===
Initially, Camp was largely active in theater, but has subsequently taken on character roles in both film and television. In 2002, he left acting and temporarily changed professions (working as a cook and mechanic), only to return two years later in Tony Kushner's Homebody/Kabul, for which he won an Obie Award (Off-Broadway Theater Awards).

Among his works on Broadway are Heartbreak House (2006), Death of a Salesman (2012) and The Crucible (2016). In 2006, Camp joined Philip Bosco and Lily Rabe in the Broadway revival of Heartbreak House at the Roundabout Theatre Company's American Airlines Theatre. In 2012, Camp joined Philip Seymour Hoffman and Andrew Garfield in Mike Nichols' Broadway revival of Death of a Salesman at the Ethel Barrymore Theatre. The show ran from March 15, 2012, through June 2, 2012 and earned rave reviews, and won the Tony Award for Best Revival of a Play. In 2016, he starred in the Broadway revival of The Crucible alongside Saoirse Ronan, Ben Whishaw, Ciaran Hinds and Sophie Okenedo at the Walter Kerr Theatre. He received a Tony Award for Best Featured Actor in a Play nomination for The Crucible.

Off-Broadway credits include starring as Gordon in Sarah Ruhl's Dead Man's Cell Phone at Playwrights Horizons in 2008, before having to withdraw due to other work commitments.

=== Film ===
Camp has been in a wide variety of films such as Lincoln (2012), 12 Years a Slave (2013), Love and Mercy (2015), Loving (2016), Molly's Game (2017), Woman Walks Ahead (2017), Vice (2018), Wildlife (2018), Dark Waters (2019), Joker (2019), and The Kitchen (2019).

On August 30, 2021, it was announced that Camp would appear as Matthew Burke in an adaptation of Stephen King's 'Salem's Lot for Warner Bros. Pictures and New Line Cinema. He played a supporting role in Sound of Freedom, starring Jim Caviezel. In 2023 he played funeral home owner Ray Loewen in The Burial.

=== Television ===
In 2011, he appeared in the second season of the HBO TV series Boardwalk Empire as the hunter Glenmore. Camp has also appeared in Law & Order, The Good Wife, The Leftovers and The Night Of, receiving a Primetime Emmy Award nomination for the latter. In 2018, he played FBI agent Bob Chesney, in the critically acclaimed and Emmy-nominated miniseries The Looming Tower. In 2020, Camp became narrator of Forensic Files II on HLN, replacing the popular narrator Peter Thomas. He also played Mr. Shaibel in the Netflix miniseries The Queen's Gambit. Camp had a secondary but significant role in the 2021 Showtime series American Rust starring Jeff Daniels. His performance was widely praised by television critics. The series was an adaptation of Philipp Meyer's novel of the same title. In 2024, he played Raymond Horgan in the Apple TV adaptation of Presumed Innocent, with his wife Elizabeth Marvel playing his on-screen wife Lorraine Horgan.

== Personal life ==
Camp and his wife, actress Elizabeth Marvel, married in 2004 and are the parents of a son.

== Awards and nominations ==
Year	Awards	Category	Work	Result	Ref.
2016	Tony Awards	Best Featured Actor in a Play	The Crucible	Nominated	
2017	Primetime Emmy Awards	Outstanding Supporting Actor in a Limited Series or Movie	The Night Of	Nominated	
2021	Screen Actors Guild Awards	Outstanding Actor in a Miniseries or Television Movie	The Queen's Gambit	Nominated	
2025	Primetime Emmy Awards	Outstanding Supporting Actor in a Limited or Anthology Series or Movie	Presumed Innocent	Nominated	
