= Felicia Tang =

American actress and model (1977-2009)

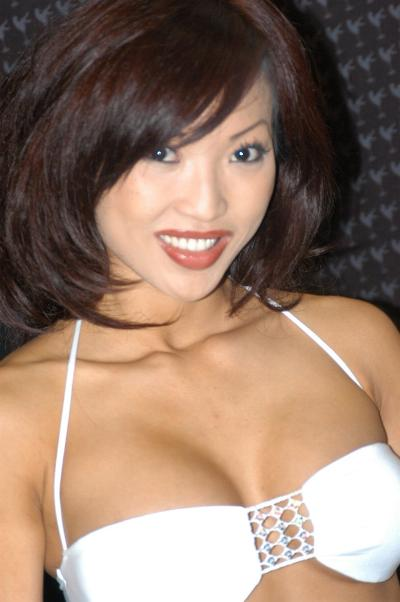
- Tang at the Erotica Los Angeles June 2006 convention
- Born: Felicia Lee; 1977 or 1978; Singapore
- Died: September 11, 2009 (aged 31); Monrovia, California, U.S.
- Resting place: Rose Hills Memorial Park
- Occupations: Actress; model
- Height: 1.68 m (5 ft 6 in)

Felicia Lee (1977 or 1978 – September 11, 2009), better known by her stage name Felicia Tang, was an American actress and model known for her work with Playboy TV, calendars, internet sites, and import car shows.

== Early life ==
Tang was born in Singapore. She moved to Perth, Western Australia, where she attended a girl's private Catholic school for two years. When she was 13 years-old, she moved with her family to Los Angeles, California. She started modeling for fashion catalogs and bikini calendars at the age of 19, while pursuing a course in marketing and business administration in college.

== Career ==
Tang made softcore appearances in adult videos for Peach DVD, including the titles Asian Fever, Hotel Decadence, Sugar Daddy Wanted, and Peach Ultra Vixens: Asians. She appeared on Playboy TV multiple times (such as on Naked Sports & 7 Lives Xposed) and made appearances on other adult cable programs. Her mainstream film appearances include uncredited roles in Rush Hour 2 (2001), Cradle 2 the Grave and The Fast and the Furious (also 2001).

Tang started her own website (FeliciaTang.com) in 2002. The site featured erotic material such as nude images, webcam, and film stills. Tang blogged and chatted with members of the site, cultivating a friendly atmosphere with her readers. A model who worked with Tang described her as "a bright, bubbly, kind, beautiful woman." In 2003, she appeared in an erotic online video with Singapore-born television personality Tila Tequila. The video featured the two nude models fondling each other in a swimming pool. Tang closed the website in October 2008 and announced that she was retiring from modeling to pursue a career in real estate. All of the content on her website went offline in 2008.

Tang was a competitor on a pay-per-view strip poker TV tournament hosted by Carmen Electra.

== Death ==
In April 2009, she met Brian Lee Randone in Las Vegas. He was a former pastor and reality show contestant (on The Sexiest Bachelor In America in 2000), and they started dating. They had been living together for four months when Tang was found dead on September 11 at their house. Randone was charged with murder and torture and held for $2 million in bail.

Following her death, Tang's family released a statement reading: "Felicia loved life and lived it to its fullest. However, she was more than just a public figure. Felicia was above all a human being, a daughter, a sister, a friend to many who continue to love and honor her, as much in life and in her passing."

Randone's trial began on November 16, 2011. The medical examiner stated that Tang was found with 320 wounds from blunt force trauma (not including bruises) and with high doses of the drug GHB in her system, together with trace amounts of cocaine. A witness testified that Tang had been a regular user of GHB for years, and that she had also used cocaine and/or crystal methamphetamine. The prosecution argued that Tang was forcibly smothered, while the defense argued that she died from a GHB overdose and that the wounds were caused by falls and seizures related to GHB consumption. On December 9, 2011, Randone was found not guilty on both charges.

The trial attracted significant media attention, with the case dubbed "the preacher and the porn star", and has had further media coverage in subsequent years. The verdict surprised the prosecution; the presence of pulseless electrical activity in Tang's body was one detail presented at trial and cited in interviews with jurors as a reason to acquit.

== Partial filmography ==
- 2001 The Fast and the Furious as Hot Chick (uncredited)
- 2001 Rush Hour 2 as High Roller Girl (uncredited)
- 2003 Cradle 2 The Grave as Pretty Girl (uncredited)
