= Deborah Jeanne Dawkins =

American politician (born 1951)

Member of the Mississippi Senate from the 48th district
- In office January 4, 2000 – January 7, 2020
- Preceded by: Clyde Woodfield
- Succeeded by: Mike Thompson

Personal details
- Born: December 1, 1951 (age 74) Dallas, Texas, U.S.
- Party: Democratic
- Education: University of Southern Mississippi
- Occupation: Surgical technician, marketing consultant

Deborah Jeanne Dawkins (née Johnson, born December 1, 1951) is an American politician who was a Democratic former member of the Mississippi Senate, representing the 48th District from 1999 to 2020.

== Senate career ==
Dawkins was a volunteer lobbyist for groups including the Sierra Club and the League of Women Voters at the Mississippi Legislature from 1996 to 1999. In 1999, she decided to run for the Mississippi State Senate. In an upset, Dawkins defeated 12-year incumbent Clyde Woodfield in the Democratic primary, and met no opposition in the general election for the 2000-2004 term.

In the 2016-2020 session, Dawkins was a member of nine Senate committees, and was the primary sponsor of 634 bills and the secondary sponsor of one bill. Upon Governor Phil Bryant signing a bill into law in 2014 that banned abortions from taking place after 18 weeks of pregnancy, Dawkins said, "It occurs to me the past few years that a lot of men do not understand how the female body works. This is about removing the rights of women without means, whether anybody here is willing to admit it or not. Because this is women's bodies, and they're used to controlling women in so many other ways, they're very comfortable with it." She has also expressed her support for legalization of medical marijuana. In January 2015 Dawkins introduced a bill into the legislature that would give patients with serious medical conditions the access to medical marijuana and would reclassify the drug as a Schedule II substance.

Dawkins filed for reelection in 2019; however, she lost the Democratic primary with 41.3% of the vote.

== Personal life ==
Dawkins has three children and four grandchildren. Dawkins attends Mount Zion Methodist Church in DeLisle, Mississippi. Dawkins is a member of several organizations including the League of Women Voters, National Caucus of Environmental Legislators, America Association of University Women, and the University of Southern Mississippi Alumni Association.
