= Daniel O'Keeffe =

Daniel O'Keeffe may refer to

- Daniel O'Keeffe (judge)
- Daniel O'Keeffe (swimmer)

== See also ==
- Daniel O'Keefe (disambiguation)
