= Alderwoods Group =

Funeral service provider in North America

- Industry: Funeral
- Founded: 2002
- Defunct: 2005
- Fate: Defunct, Bought by Service Corporation International
- Successor: Service Corporation International
- Number of employees: 8,300 (2005)

Alderwoods Group, formally The Alderwoods Group, Inc., was a provider of funeral, cremation, and cemetery services in North America with operations in the United States, Canada and Puerto Rico. Its executive office was in Toronto, Ontario, and it had administrative offices in Cincinnati, Ohio, and Burnaby, British Columbia.

As of June 17, 2006, Alderwoods had 579 funeral homes, 72 cemeteries and 61 combination funeral homes and cemeteries in 36 states, seven Canadian provinces and Puerto Rico. The company's locations included Rose Hills Memorial Park, considered to be the largest memorial park in the world.

The Alderwoods Group formed on January 2, 2002, after the Loewen Group, then the second largest funeral home and cemetery operator in North America, emerged from bankruptcy. In November 2006, Alderwoods was acquired by Service Corporation International in a US$1.2 billion deal reached in April of the same year.
