= Diane Peranich =

American politician

Member of the Mississippi House of Representatives from the 121st district
- In office January 12, 1988 – January 10, 2012
- Preceded by: Clyde Woodfield
- Succeeded by: Carolyn Crawford

Personal details
- Born: January 11, 1940 (age 86) Biloxi, Mississippi
- Party: Democratic

Diane Peranich (born January 11, 1940) is an American politician who served in the Mississippi House of Representatives from the 121st district from 1988 to 2012. She lived in Pass Christian.

Republican Carolyn Crawford defeated her in the 2011 election.
