= Mike Thompson (Mississippi politician) =

American politician

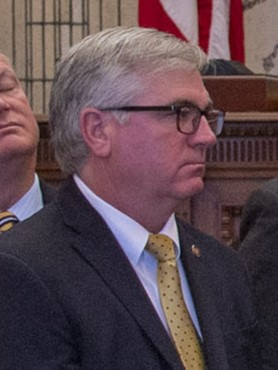

Member of the Mississippi State Senate from the 48th district
- Incumbent
- Assumed office January 7, 2020
- Preceded by: Deborah Jeanne Dawkins

Personal details
- Born: Michael James Thompson; November 5, 1976 (age 49) Metairie, Louisiana, U.S.
- Party: Republican
- Children: 2
- Education: Texas A&M University; Loyola University New Orleans College of Law
- Occupation: Attorney

Michael James Thompson (born November 5, 1976) is an American politician serving in the Mississippi State Senate from the 48th district since 2020.

== Early life and education ==
Thompson was born in Metairie, Louisiana and attended the Catholic boarding school Saint Stanislaus in Bay St. Louis, Mississippi. He graduated from Texas A&M University. He entered law school at Loyola University New Orleans College of Law, graduating with a Juris Doctor. He was admitted to the Mississippi Bar on April 26, 2011.

== Career ==
Thompson worked on tugboats and other supply vessels in the Gulf of Mexico, working his way up to captain. After graduating from law school, he worked for a regional defense law firm, representing small businesses.

Thompson ran for election to the Mississippi State Senate in 2019, where he earned 59.3% of the vote in the Republican primary and 51.6% in the general election, flipping the district from the Democratic incumbent; he assumed office on January 7, 2020.

As of 2020, in the Senate, he chairs the Investigate State Offices committee and is the vice-chair for the Ports and Marine Resources committee. He is a member of these additional committees: Constitution; Environment Protection, Conservation, and Water Resources; Finance; Gaming; Highway and Transportation; Judiciary, Division B; and Tourism.

== Political positions ==
In 2020, he voted to change the Mississippi state flag.

== Personal life ==
Thompson is married and has two children. He is Christian.
