= The Burial (film) =

2023 American film by Maggie Betts

- Release poster
- Directed by: Maggie Betts
- Screenplay by: Doug Wright; Maggie Betts
- Story by: Doug Wright
- Based on: "The Burial" by Jonathan Harr
- Produced by: Bobby Shriver; Jenette Kahn; Adam Richman; Jamie Foxx; Datari Turner; Celine Rattray; Trudie Styler
- Starring: Tommy Lee Jones; Jamie Foxx; Jurnee Smollett; Alan Ruck; Mamoudou Athie; Pamela Reed; Bill Camp
- Cinematography: Maryse Alberti
- Edited by: Lee Percy; Jay Cassidy
- Music by: Michael Abels
- Production companies: Amazon MGM Studios; Double Nickel Entertainment; Foxxhole Productions; Maven Screen Media; Bobby Shriver Productions
- Distributed by: Amazon Prime Video
- Release dates: September 11, 2023 (TIFF); October 6, 2023 (United States)
- Running time: 126 minutes
- Country: United States
- Language: English
- Budget: $32.5 million

The Burial is a 2023 American legal drama film directed by Maggie Betts and written by Betts and Doug Wright. It is loosely based on the true story of lawyer Willie E. Gary and his client Jeremiah Joseph O'Keefe's lawsuit against the Loewen funeral company, as documented in the 1999 New Yorker article of the same name by Jonathan Harr. It stars Jamie Foxx as Gary, Tommy Lee Jones as O'Keefe, Jurnee Smollett, Mamoudou Athie, and Bill Camp.

It premiered at the Toronto International Film Festival on September 11, 2023, and was released by Amazon MGM Studios in a limited release on October 6, 2023, prior to streaming via Prime Video on October 13, 2023.

== Plot ==
In 1995, financially troubled funeral home owner Jeremiah Joseph O'Keefe is forced to sell parts of his business to meet financial demands by the Mississippi State Insurance Commission after losing tons of money from a Ponzi scheme by one of his business associates. He makes a contract with Raymond Loewen of the Loewen Group, who offers to buy three funeral homes but O'Keefe demands that the Loewen Group must not sell funeral insurance to settle the deal. Four months later, the Loewen Group still delays their payment for the purchase of the three funeral homes. Furthermore, Raymond never honored the oral agreement between him and Jeremiah of not selling funeral insurance. His young lawyer Hal Dockins suggests that Loewen is intentionally trying to run O‘Keefe into bankruptcy by delaying the payment to snatch up his entire business at a cheaper cost.

An enraged O'Keefe hires Willie E. Gary, a flashy Florida personal injury lawyer, at Dockins' suggestion, because he thinks that his white contract lawyer Mike Allred will be unable to convince the presumably black jury. Initially, Allred wants a settlement of US$8 million but Gary fires back confidently that they could get a $100 million settlement instead. With such a huge potential payout, O'Keefe names Gary as his lead attorney and even re-mortgages his own home to pay for his services. Upon receiving the offer, Loewen hires a black lawyer team fronted by Mame Downes for similar reasons.

In court, O'Keefe is cornered when Downes questions his character and points out his financial troubles stem from business deals with a now-convicted felon. Blaming Gary, O'Keefe replaces him with Allred as lead attorney. Dockins produces a valuable witness who insinuates that Loewen overcharges minority communities. Downes in turn questions Allred and reveals that his grandfather was a member of the Ku Klux Klan. When Gary stands up for Allred, his angered black legal team leaves him. Allred realizes he is too compromised and retracts from the case to give the team a higher chance to win.

Just when O'Keefe decides to drop the case, Dockins digs up a lead to the black National Baptist Church, revealing that the Loewen group did exploit the church members to sell overpriced packages to other members of the black community. When Raymond Loewen is confronted with this in court and shows no remorse, the jury is swayed in O'Keefe's favor, awarding him US$500 million in damages—$100 million in compensatory damages and $400 million in punitive damages. Two years later, Ray Loewen gets fired from his position and the company eventually goes into bankruptcy.

After the closing credits Willie E. Gary in person appears in a cameo.

== Cast ==
- Jamie Foxx as Willie E. Gary
- Tommy Lee Jones as Jeremiah O'Keefe
- Jurnee Smollett as Mame Downes
- Alan Ruck as Mike Allred
- Mamoudou Athie as Hal Dockins
- Pamela Reed as Annette O'Keefe
- Bill Camp as Raymond Loewen
- Amanda Warren as Gloria Gary
- Dorian Missick as Reggie Douglas
- Lance E. Nichols as James E. Graves Jr.
- Billy Slaughter as Robert Sperry

== Production ==
The film is an adaptation of Jonathan Harr's article "The Burial", published in 1999 by The New Yorker. Harr's article was originally optioned in 2001 by Warner Bros. Pictures, with producers Ed Saxon and Bobby Shriver attached to produce. That same year, Ron Howard attached to direct the movie, with his Imagine Entertainment joining as an additional producer.. At the time, Denzel Washington and Will Smith were approached about playing the lead role of lawyer Willie E. Gary, but passed, and eventually Warners put the project into turnaround. By 2008, it had been setup again at Sony's Screen Gems label, with Stephen Frears attached to direct. Bernie Mac and Kevin Hart were at various points attached to the Screen Gems version, but again the movie failed to enter production. In March 2018, Amazon Studios announced it was developing the film with Doug Wright writing the script and Alexander Payne in talks to direct. By November 2020, Maggie Betts came on board to direct with Jamie Foxx attached to star and produce. In October 2021, Tommy Lee Jones joined the cast in a role Harrison Ford was considered for. In November, Jurnee Smollett was added to the cast. Principal photography took place in New Orleans, starting in March 2022.

== Release ==
The Burial premiered at the Toronto International Film Festival on September 11, 2023. It was released by Amazon MGM Studios in a limited release on October 6, 2023, prior to streaming via Prime Video on October 13, 2023.

== Reception ==
On the review aggregator website Rotten Tomatoes, 92% of 123 critics' reviews are positive, with an average rating of 7.2/10. The website's consensus reads: "A solid courtroom drama led by a pair of nicely contrasted performances, The Burial hits the expected genre beats -- and remains a crowd-pleasing treat at every turn." Metacritic, which uses a weighted average, assigned the film a score of 74 out of 100, based on 23 critics, indicating "generally favorable" reviews.
