= Sally S. Emory =

- Born: Sally Starks Emory; September 23, 1864; Kentucky
- Died: May 21, 1959 (aged 94)

Sally Starks Emory (September 23, 1864 - May 21, 1959) was the president of Girls' Friendly Society and vice-chairman of the board of the American Red Cross.

== Early life ==
Sally Starks was born in Kentucky on September 23, 1864. She graduated from Emerson College of Expression in Boston and became instructor in elocution at Syracuse University, New York.

== Career ==
For 5 years Sally S. Emory was the president of Girls' Friendly Society.

She was the president of the East Whittier Club.

She was the local representative of the American Travelers Aid.

She was the vice-chairman of the board of the American Red Cross and in 1917 she was among the organizers, and first president, of the Whittier Chapter of the Red Cross.

She was active in all social and club work.

She was a member of the Whittier Woman's Club.

She was a dilettante actress with the Whittier Community Players:

- in 1923 she had the role of Aunt Ida in "Green Stockings" by A.E.W. Mason represented at the Scenic Theater.
- in 1928 she had a role in "Graustark", dramatized from the book of that name, represented at the High School Auditorium. R.R. Miller was the male lead and Dorothy Anne Douglas was the female lead. Always in 1928 Emory directed the Drama Department of the Whittier Women's Club for the opening event of the 1928–29 season; they presented a sketch entitled "An Old Fashioned Garden".
- in 1932 she had a role in "Just Suppose" by A.E. Thomas represented at the Whittier Woman's Clubhouse. The female lead was Doris D. Field.
- in 1933 she had a role in "Intimate Strangers" by Booth Tarkington represented at the Whittier Woman's Clubhouse. The female lead was Abigail Dunn.
- in 1934 she had a role in "Mignonette" by Robert St. Clair represented at the Whittier Woman's Clubhouse. The same St. Clair played the role of Jonathan Mills, the male lead, and his wife Kathryn Prather played opposite to him.
- in 1936 she had a role in "Double Door" by Elizabeth McFadden represented at the Whittier Woman's Clubhouse. The female lead was Laura Frankenfield.

In 1929 Emory was on the building committee in charge of the new St. Matthias Episcopal Church, designed by William E. Young of Los Angeles.

== Personal life ==
Sally S. Emory lived in New York and moved to California in 1905 and lived at "Four Acres", 728 South Painter Ave., Whittier, California. She married Arthur Theodore Emory (1862-1960) and had one son, John P. Moore (died on December 23, 1947).

She died on May 21, 1959, and is buried at Rose Hills Memorial Park, Whittier.
