= Clyde Woodfield =

American politician (1932–2001)

Clyde V. Woodfield

Member of the Mississippi Senate from the 48th district
- In office January 1988 – January 2000
- Preceded by: George P. Smith
- Succeeded by: Deborah Jeanne Dawkins

Member of the Mississippi House of Representatives from the 121st district
- In office January 1984 – January 1988
- Preceded by: Joe B. Rouse
- Succeeded by: Diane Peranich

Member of the Mississippi House of Representatives from the Post No. 3, Harrison County district
- In office January 1968 – January 1972
- Preceded by: Charles Kistner Pringle
- Succeeded by: Jerry O'Keefe

Personal details
- Born: February 11, 1932 Pike County, Mississippi
- Died: September 29, 2001 (aged 69)
- Party: Democratic

Clyde V. Woodfield (February 11, 1932 – September 29, 2001) was a state legislator in Mississippi. He served in the Mississippi Senate from 1988–2000, and in the Mississippi House of Representatives for eight years before that. He was a Democrat.

After 12 years in office he lost in the 1999 Democratic Party primary to Deborah Jeanne Dawkins. Woodfield died on September 29, 2001. His widow, Sharon, is a disability rights advocate.
