= Rose Hills Memorial Park =

Cemetery in California

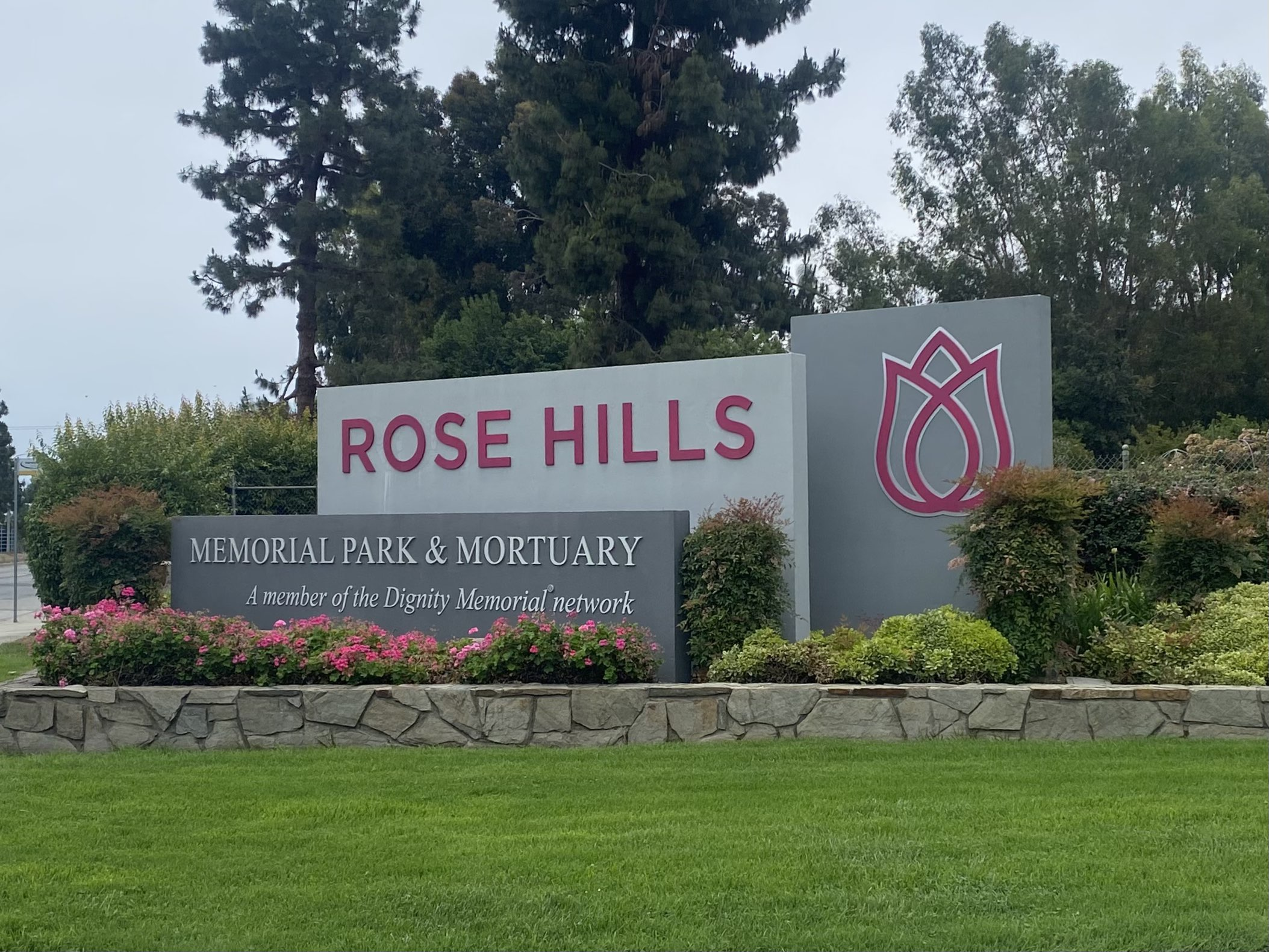
- Gate 1 entrance sign
- Interactive map of Rose Hills Memorial Park

Details
- Established: 1914
- Location: Whittier, California
- Country: United States
- Coordinates: 34°00′36″N 118°01′26″W
- Owned by: Dignity Memorial
- Size: 1,400 acres (570 ha)
- Website: www.rosehills.com
- Find a Grave: Rose Hills Memorial Park

Rose Hills Memorial Park is a cemetery and mortuary located in northern Whittier, California. It is an affiliate of Service Corporation International (formerly Loewen Group) and is the largest cemetery in North America.

== Sites ==
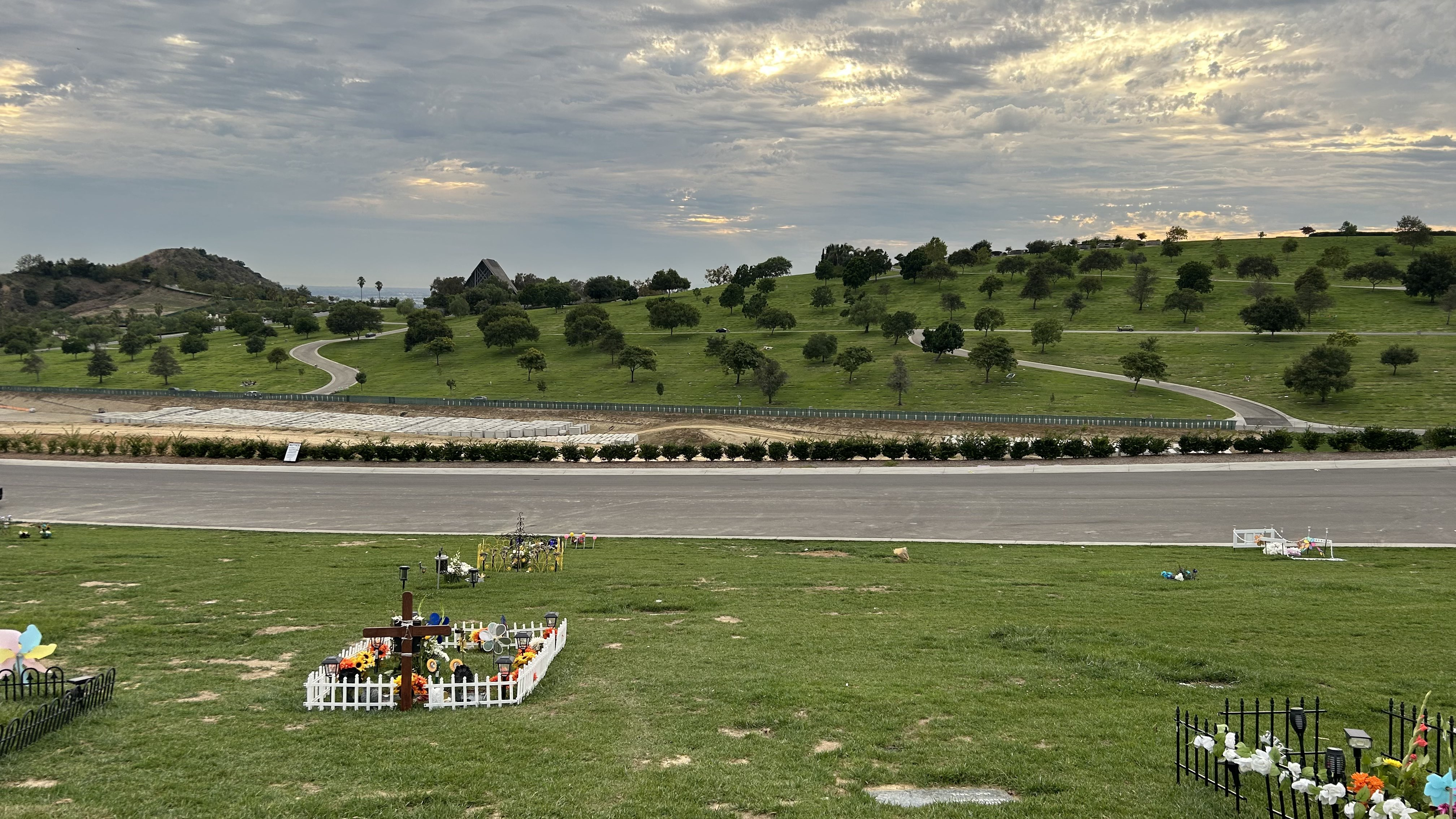
A view of the cemetery from the east, with the SkyRose Chapel in view.

Mausoleums

- Whittier Heights Mausoleum, built in 1917 as "Mausoleum #1" or "The Little Mausoleum", was the second public mausoleum in California (the first being at Anaheim Cemetery in Anaheim) and portrays a sense of early California architecture with its Spanish Renaissance influence.
- Over a period of years, four garden mausoleums (Terrace of Memories, Court of Eternal Light, Mausoleum of the Valley, and Lakeview Mausoleum) were constructed.
- El Portal de la Paz (Doorway of Peace) was dedicated in 1930 as part of the initial expansion program at the cemetery. Complete with an enclosed outdoor garden and fountain, Rose Hills' second mausoleum reflects California's early Spanish Mission era. The hallways are named for the California Missions.
- The Buddhist Columbarium: Built in 1999, located on 2.5 acres (10,000 m^{2}) at the highest elevation of Rose Hills, is the largest Buddhist pagoda in the United States. The three-story structure, containing 21,000 niches for the interment of cremated remains, is supported by crimson pillars and golden glazed tiles replicating the architecture of ancient Chinese palaces. The pagoda is associated with Fo Guang Shan's Hsi Lai Temple in Hacienda Heights.

Chapels

- Rainbow Chapel, built in 1942 as "Rose Chapel", is an example of early California Mission architecture. This chapel has a maximum seating capacity of 90 people. It is located behind El Portal de la Paz Mausoleum.
- Hillside Chapel, built in 1956, is a contemporary diamond-shaped structure surrounded by a garden area. The interior was created for an effect of a sunrise through its rose-tinted skylight and 22-foot (6.7 m)-high windows. Hillside Chapel seats up to 182 people. This building is said to have perfect acoustics.
- Sky Church, a glass building also completed in 1956, was destroyed by the Whittier Narrows earthquake of 1987.
- Memorial Chapel has three tall white spires. It was completed in 1964 as a memorial to John D. Gregg, President of Rose Hills from 1950 to 1959 and son of Rose Hills founder Augustus Gregg. Memorial Chapel seats approximately 192 people.
- SkyRose Chapel is on a central hilltop with a view of the San Gabriel Valley, Los Angeles Skylines to the West and Sycamore Valley to the East. SkyRose Chapel seats 300 people. The building consists of three levels, the upper containing a custom Quimby pipe organ, one of the largest in the Los Angeles area. The lower level is an 11,200 sq. ft. mausoleum. The corridors of the mausoleum are named for the woods used in the building's construction. SkyRose was built in the 1990s, replacing Sky Church
- Saint Nicholas Chapel, established in 1999 by Greek Orthodox Memorial & Cultural Foundation of Southern California, is an independent Non-Profit Religious Corporation supporting the Greek Orthodox Metropolis of San Francisco.

Gardens

- Cherry Blossom Lawn, a Japanese garden with 2-acre Lake of the Roses (0.81 ha) and an azumaya (meditation house).

== Notable burials ==
- Dorothy Abbott (1920–1968), actress
- Alvin Ailey (1931–1989), dancer
- Lamar Allen (1914–1989), baseball player
- Troy Archer (1955–1979), football player
- Lewis Arquette (1935–2001), actor
- George W. C. Baker (1872–1953), politician
- Jerry Barber (1916–1994), golfer
- Griff Barnett (1884–1958), actor
- Brent Billingsley (1975–2024), baseball player
- Keith Black (1926–1991), racing engineer
- Marlin Briscoe (1945–2023), football player
- Dominic Brooklier (1914–1984), mobster
- Timothy Carey (1929–1994), actor
- Ken Carson (1914–1994), country singer
- Bobby Castillo (1955–2014), baseball player
- Bob Chandler (1949–1995), football player
- Boyd Coddington (1944–2008), hot rod builder
- Charley Cowan (1938–1988), football player
- Donfeld (1934–2007), costume designer
- Kathryn Eames (1908–2004), actress
- Eazy-E (1964–1995), rapper
- Ted Edwards (1884–1945), actor
- Sally S. Emory (1864–1959), philanthropist
- Jaime Escalante (1930–2010), educator
- Ron Glass (1945–2016), actor
- Mary Gordon (1882–1963), actress
- Bryan Gregory (1951–2001), guitarist
- Nathan W. Hale (1860–1941), politician
- Pearl Hart (1871–1955), outlaw
- Walt Hazzard (1942–2011), basketball player
- Harold A. Henry (1895–1966), newspaper publisher and politician
- Dick Hoerner (1922–2010), football player
- Wally Hood (1895–1965), baseball player
- William Hopper (1915–1970), actor
- Clara Horton (1904–1976), actress
- Dick Hugg (1928-2006), radio disc jockey
- Gladys Hulette (1896–1991), actress
- Anthony Johnson (1966–2021), actor
- Louis Johnson (1955–2015), bassist
- T. C. Jones (1920–1971), female impersonator
- Goodwin Knight (1896–1970), politician
- Nguyễn Cao Kỳ (1930–2011), politician, Prime Minister of South Vietnam
- Jack Larson (1928–2015), actor
- Tommy Lasorda (1927–2021), baseball player, coach and manager
- Billy Laughlin (1932–1948), actor
- Bob Leach (1914–2008), journalist and author
- Guan Linzheng (1905–1980), Chinese general
- Keye Luke (1904–1991), actor
- Link Lyman (1898–1972), football player
- Dave MacDonald (1936–1964), racing driver
- Linda Martinez (1975–2015), pianist and composer
- Chuck McMurtry (1937–2014), football player
- Felicitas Méndez (1916–1998), civil rights activist.
- Bob Meusel (1896–1977), baseball player
- Haing S. Ngor (1940–1996), actor
- Lupe Ontiveros (1942–2012), actress
- Hsin Ping (1938–1995), Buddhist monk
- Rosa Porto (1930–2019), baker and businesswoman
- Hugh Prosser (1907–1952), actor
- John Spenkelink (1949–1979), convicted murderer
- Robin Stille (1961–1996), actress
- Mark St. John (1956–2007), guitarist
- Miiko Taka (1925–2023), actress
- Felicia Tang (1977–2009), actress and model
- Mickey Thompson (1928–1988), racing driver
- Joseph Tommasi (1951–1975), National Socialist Liberation Front leader
- Thuy Trang (1973–2001), actress
- Dương Văn Minh (1916–2001), politician, President of South Vietnam
- Alan Wiggins (1958–1991), baseball player
- Ellen Beach Yaw (1869–1947), opera singer

Members of the Richard Nixon family (his parents, Francis A. and Hannah, and his brothers: Harold, Donald, and Arthur) are interred here.
