= Carolyn Crawford =

American politician

Member of the Mississippi House of Representatives from the 121st district
- Incumbent
- Assumed office January 3, 2012
- Preceded by: Diane Peranich

Personal details
- Born: March 25, 1970 (age 56)
- Party: Republican
- Children: 3
- Education: University of South Alabama

Carolyn Crawford is a Republican politician from Pass Christian, Mississippi, serving as a member of the Mississippi House of Representatives from the 121st district. She was first elected in 2011, unseating Democratic incumbent Diane Peranich.

Crawford is an enrolled member of the Saginaw Chippewa Tribal Nation.

== See also ==
- List of Native American politicians
- Native American women in politics
