= Stewart Enterprises =

American funeral services company

- Website type: Funeral services website
- Founded: April 26, 1910
- Owner: Service Corporation International (SCI)
- Founder: Albert Stewart
- Key people: Thomas J. Crawford (CEO)
- Employees: around 5,400

Stewart Enterprises, Inc., a provider of funeral and cemetery services, was founded in 1910 and grew to be the second-largest company of its kind in the United States before it was acquired in 2013.

As of 1991, the year it went public, the company was headquartered in Jefferson, Louisiana, and employed nearly 5,400 people in 218 funeral homes and 140 cemeteries in 24 states and Puerto Rico. The company was publicly traded and listed on NASDAQ under the ticker symbol STEI.

In December 2013, Service Corporation International acquired Stewart Enterprises for US$1.4 billion.

== History ==
Stewart Enterprises was founded in New Orleans in 1910 by Albert Stewart, owner of the Acme Realty Company, when his real estate business acquired the three St. Vincent de Paul Cemeteries and the St. Vincent de Paul Marble Shop, a company that built monuments for the cemeteries. Stewart kept both businesses, and they flourished. By 1931, his sons Frank Sr. and Charles incorporated the business as the Acme Marble & Granite Co. In 1949, the company established Lake Lawn Park Cemetery in New Orleans and developed a large perpetual-care community mausoleum with more than 31,000 crypts. In 1969, under the tutelage of President Frank B. Stewart, Jr. (Albert's grandson), the company purchased the adjoining Metairie Cemetery.

== Expansion ==
In the 1980s, Stewart expanded from its base in Louisiana and Texas to Florida, Maryland, Washington, D.C., and West Virginia. Frank B. Stewart, Jr. was chairman, and Thomas J. Crawford was president and chief executive officer. Thomas M. Kitchen was senior executive vice president and chief financial officer. The company went public in 1991, and, over the next several years, expanded to 30 states and 12 countries. In 1997, the firm announced a partnership with the Archdiocese of Los Angeles for the building and construction of funeral homes on nine of the Church's cemeteries and management of preneed sales at 11 cemeteries. Stewart Enterprises celebrated its centennial on April 26, 2010.

== Associations ==
Stewart's associated businesses and affiliations included the Acme Mausoleum Corporation in Texas and Louisiana; Tributes.com, an online memorial site; and Investor Trust, Inc. (ITI), a wholly owned, Texas-based investment firm for preneed trust and the company's portfolio. Stewart owned a number of historic cemeteries including Metairie Cemetery (New Orleans, La.), Royal Palm Memorial Gardens and Funeral Home (West Palm Beach, Fla.), and Wisconsin Memorial Park (Brookfield, Wis.).

Approximately 41 percent of Stewart's business was located in California, Florida, and Texas, states that have high proportions of senior citizens.
