= Dan O'Keefe =

Dan O'Keefe may refer to:

- Dan O'Keefe (writer) (born 1968), television writer and author, popularizer of Festivus on Seinfeld
- Dan O'Keefe (politician), former member of the California State Senate and the Cupertino City Council
- Dan O'Keefe (soccer), retired American soccer forward

== See also ==
- Daniel O'Keefe (disambiguation)
- Dan O'Keeffe (1907–1967), Irish Gaelic football goalkeeper
