= Neptune Society =

Cremation company

The San Francisco Columbarium has been owned and operated by the Neptune society since the 1970s

The Neptune Society, Inc., is an American funeral home-based private company that provides cremation services. It was founded in Plantation, Florida.

== History ==
The Neptune Society was established in 1973 and was incorporated in 1985. Its sibling companies are Trident Society and National Cremation.

In 1999, the Neptune Society announced its completion of equity financing of $7 million with Standard Securities Capital Corp. in Toronto, Ontario, and appointed Marco Markin as president and chief executive. In 2000, the company announced it had acquired the Cremation Society of Iowa and registered with the Securities and Exchange Commission to be listed on the Nasdaq Stock Exchange. In 2003, it was reported that an $11.5 million deal proposed by the firm of Walt Disney’s great-nephew to buy Neptune Society was called off.

In June 2011, Service Corporation International announced it had purchased control by buying a 70 percent share of the company. At that time, the company's annual revenues were more than $55 million and it had more than $125 million in future revenue on its books.

== Neptune Memorial Reef ==
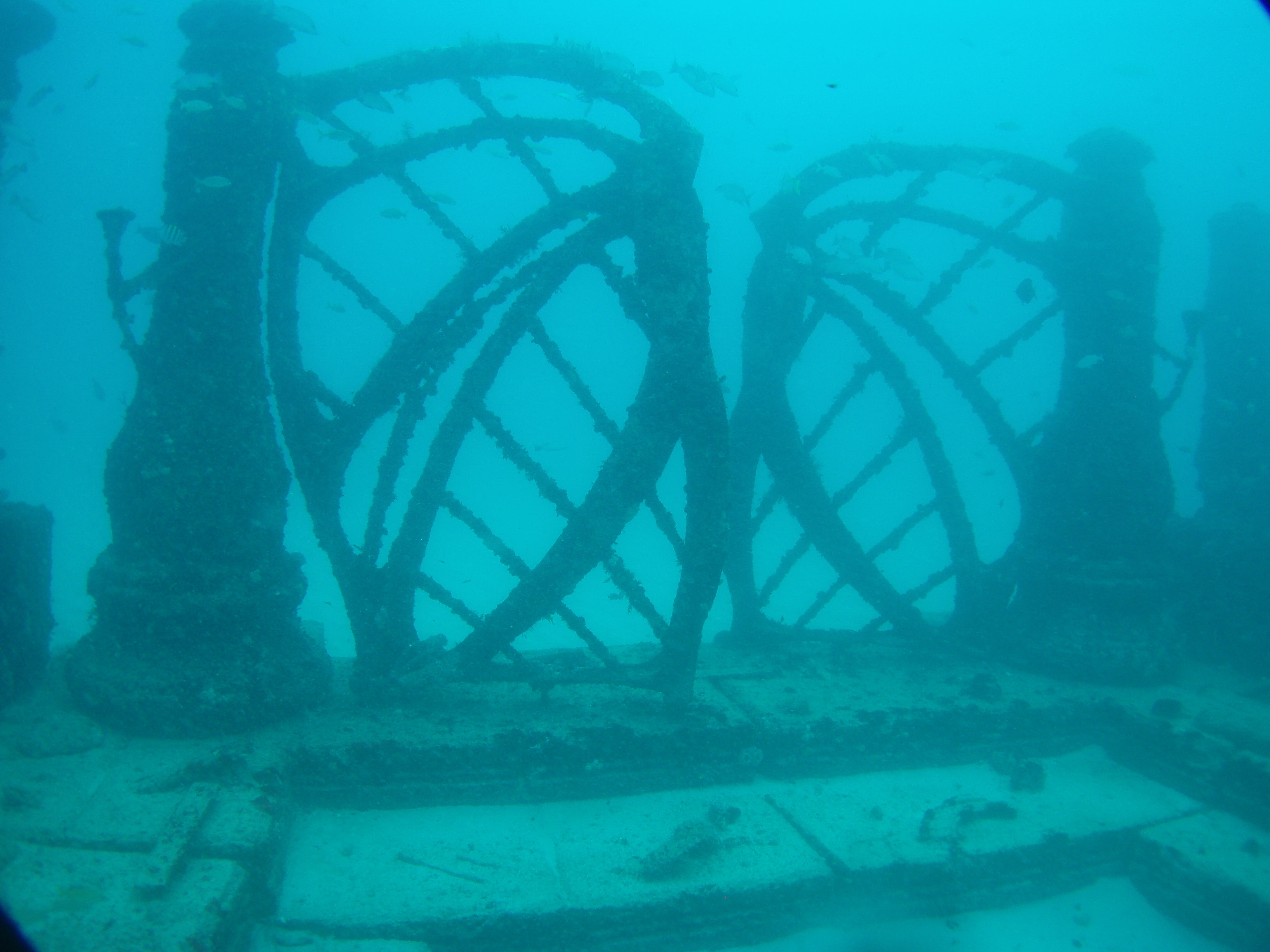
The Neptune Memorial Reef's underwater gates.

The Neptune Memorial Reef is an underwater memorial 3.25 miles (5.23 km) off the coast of Key Biscayne, Florida, where cremated ashes can be interred. Neptune's burial at sea involves mixing cremated remains into concrete for a sturdy and secure final resting place.

== Neptune Society Columbarium ==
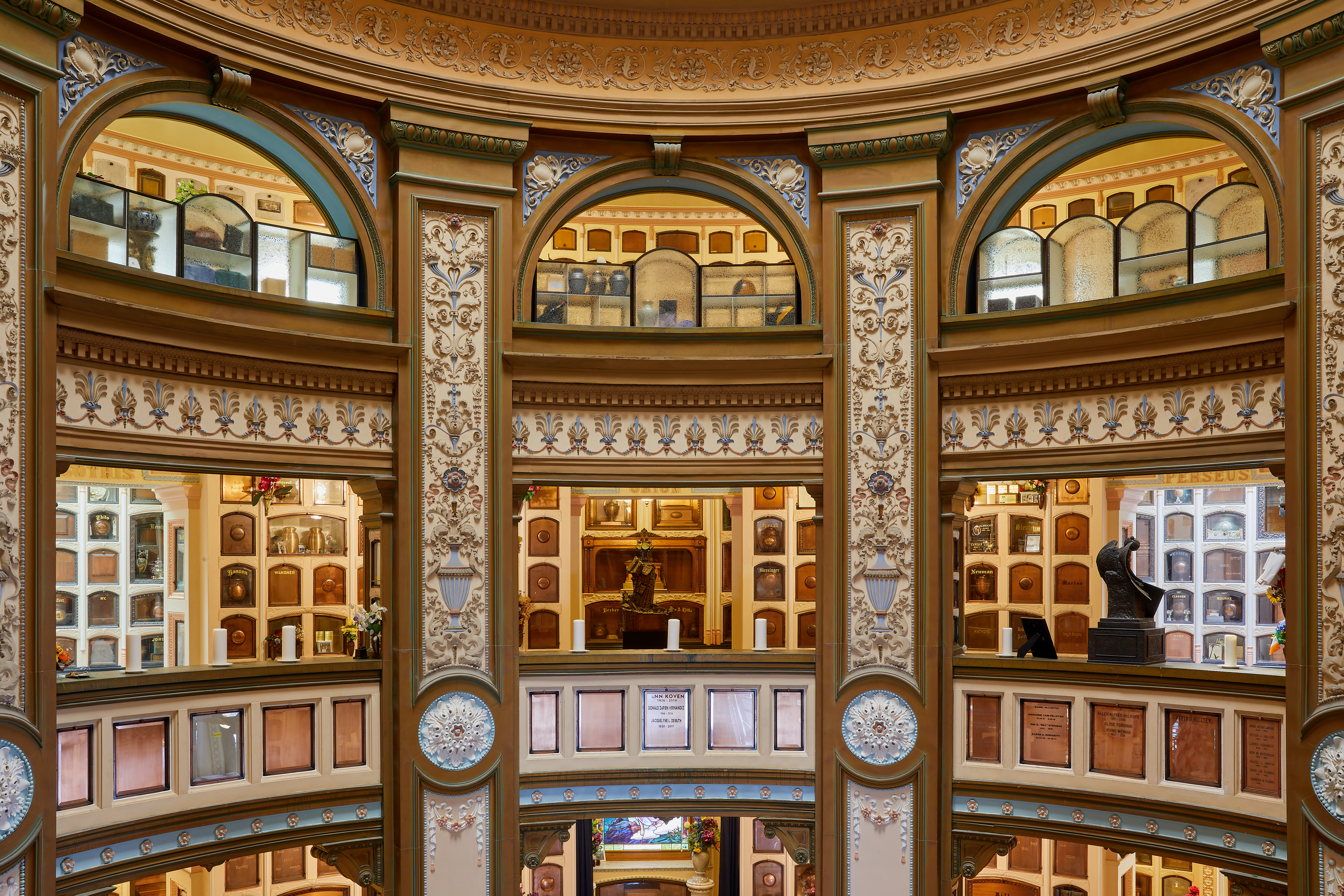
Columbarium interior

The Neptune Society Columbarium of San Francisco is an architectural landmark in San Francisco and is the city's only nondenominational public burial space. The columbarium was built in 1898 by architect Bernard J.S. Cahill and is currently operated and maintained by the Neptune Society of Northern California. The copper-domed, Neo-Classical structure houses more than 8,500 niches for cremation urns. The building was designated as a San Francisco city landmark in 1996.

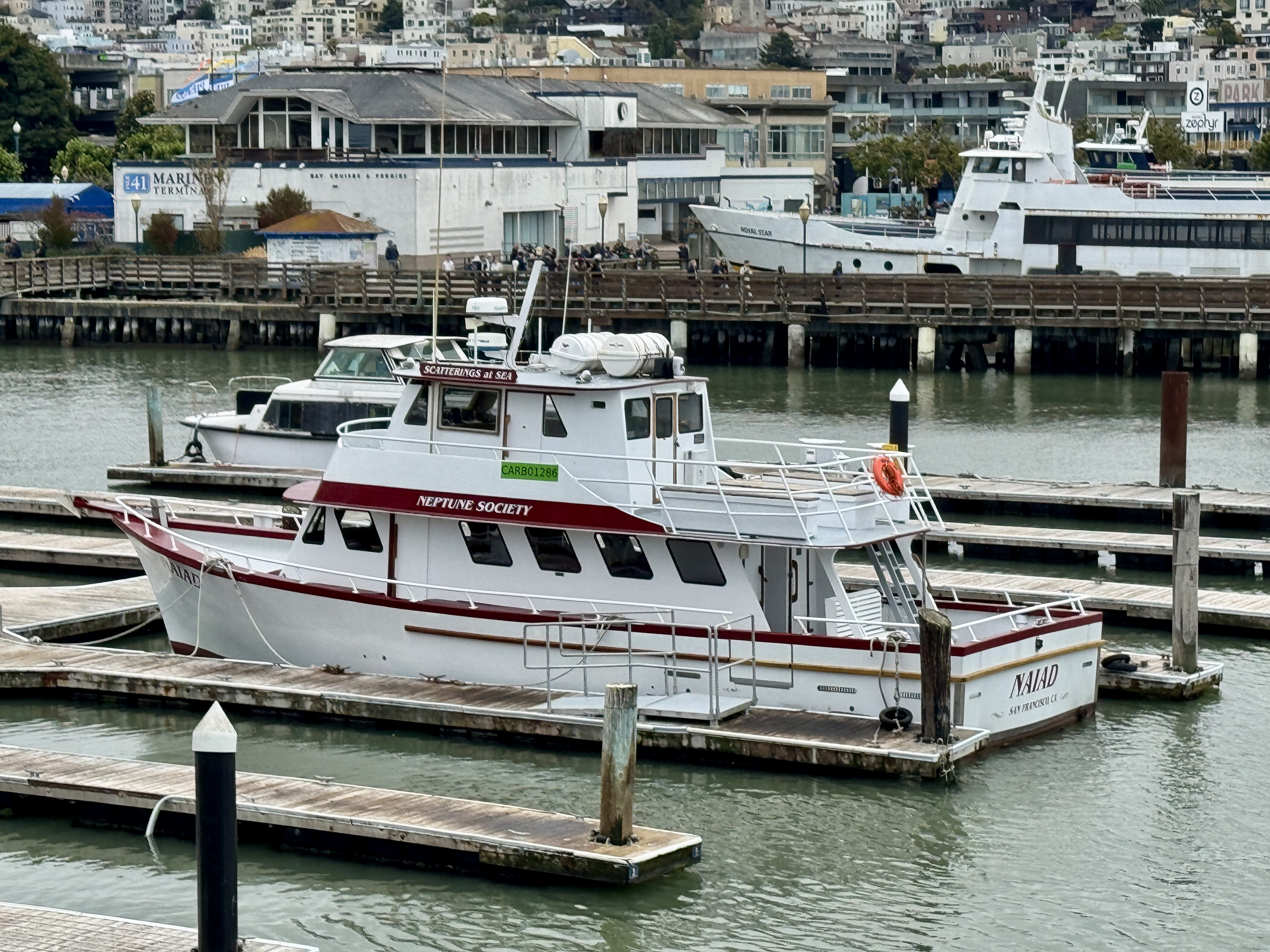
A boat owned by the Neptune Society used for scattering ashes at sea docked in San Francisco, California, in 2025

== Controversies ==
There have been a number of controversies with the Neptune Society. In the late 1990s, the company settled lawsuits from the widow of a former Burbank mayor and 308 Southern California residents who claimed remains were mishandled.

In November 2013, residents of East Oakland and members of Communities for a Better Environment (CBE) gathered around the Neptune Society office on Grand Avenue to protest against the planned construction of a new crematory that would process 3,000 remains per year. Opposition was primarily driven by environmental concerns. Arguments in favor of the facility pointed to job creation and other possible benefits of the crematory.

=== California Attorney General lawsuit and settlement (2019–2024) ===
On 2 December 2019, the California Attorney General and the district attorneys of Alameda, Marin, and San Francisco counties filed a civil enforcement action in Alameda County Superior Court against Service Corporation International (SCI) and its Neptune Society and Trident Society affiliates. The complaint alleged deceptive marketing of "Standard Plan" pre‑need cremation packages, failure to place required funds in trust, and misleading statements about refunds and veterans’ benefits.

In May 2024, a stipulated judgment required SCI to provide restitution, pay US$23 million in civil penalties, and implement injunctive relief, including clear disclosures and trusting of funds associated with pre‑need packages.

=== Colorado Attorney General settlement (2022) ===
On 9 August 2022, Colorado Attorney General Phil Weiser announced an agreement resolving allegations that SCI’s Neptune Society and Trident Society operations violated the Colorado Consumer Protection Act by misrepresenting payment handling, failing to deposit required amounts into trust, and inadequately disclosing refund rights.

Under the settlement, SCI agreed to pay more than US$8 million in restitution to about 5,000 consumers, reform sales practices, provide written disclosures on trusting and refund policies, and submit to three years of compliance monitoring.

=== Florida federal class action settlement (2020–2022) ===
In April 2020, a federal class action filed in the U.S. District Court for the Southern District of Florida alleged that SCI’s Neptune Society required customers to sign separate service and merchandise contracts, placed less than the required 70 percent of pre‑need funds into trust, and failed to provide full refunds; the suit covered roughly 87,000 Florida customers.

In September 2022, SCI agreed to a settlement valued at up to US$209 million, offering full refunds to eligible customers for purchases made since 1 April 2016; SCI denied wrongdoing.
