= Charles Kistner Pringle =

American politician (1931–2024)

Member of the Mississippi House of Representatives
- In office June 14, 1965 – January 1968
- Preceded by: Harry G. Walker
- Succeeded by: Clyde Woodfield

Personal details
- Born: May 13, 1931 Avon Park, Florida, U.S.
- Died: March 10, 2024 (aged 92)
- Party: Republican

Charles Kistner Pringle (May 13, 1931 – March 10, 2024) was an American politician. He served as a Republican member of the Mississippi House of Representatives.

== Life and career ==
Pringle was born in Avon Park, Florida. He was an attorney.

In 1964, Pringle was elected to the Mississippi House of Representatives, winning a special election after Harry G. Walker resigned. He was sworn in on June 14, 1965, and was defeated for re-election in 1967.

Pringle died on March 10, 2024, at the age of 92.
