= Jeremiah Joseph O'Keefe =

American politician

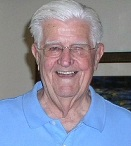
- O'Keefe in December 2011

Mayor of Biloxi, Mississippi
- In office 1973–1981

Member of the Mississippi House of Representatives
- In office 1960–1964

Personal details
- Born: July 12, 1923 Ocean Springs, Mississippi, US
- Died: August 23, 2016 (aged 93) Biloxi, Mississippi, US
- Cause of death: Heart failure
- Children: 13; including Jeremiah IV
- Nicknames: Jerry; The Kamikaze Killer

Military service
- Allegiance: United States
- Branch/service: United States Navy, United States Marine Corps
- Years of service: 1942–1945
- Rank: First lieutenant
- Battles/wars: World War II: Battle of Okinawa
- Awards: Navy Cross; Distinguished Flying Cross; Air Medal (2); Congressional Gold Medal

Jeremiah Joseph O'Keefe III (July 12, 1923 – August 23, 2016) was an American fighter ace, Democratic Party politician, insurance executive, and funeral director. As a Marine pilot in World War II he received the Navy Cross for five of the seven kills he recorded over Okinawa. After the war he entered politics, serving as a member of the Mississippi House of Representatives from 1960 to 1964 and as the mayor of Biloxi, Mississippi, from 1973 to 1981. The most prominent funeral homeowner in Biloxi, he won a $500 million jury award in a contractual dispute with the rival funeral home company Loewen Group, later settling for $175 million.

O'Keefe was a major donor to and chief fundraiser for the Ohr-O'Keefe Museum Of Art, named after his wife Annette, and many other civic, cultural and charitable organizations. His son, Jeremiah Joseph O'Keefe IV, also served as a state legislator.

O'Keefe was portrayed by actor Tommy Lee Jones in the 2023 film The Burial.

== Early life and education ==
Jeremiah O'Keefe was born in Ocean Springs, Mississippi, on July 12, 1923. His parents were Jeremiah Joseph "Ben" O'Keefe and Teresa Slattery O'Keefe. He was the second of four children. With his family, he moved to Biloxi, Mississippi at age thirteen because the home he was born in and lived in was lost to the family during the Depression. O'Keefe went to St. Alphonsus Elementary School in Ocean Springs, Mississippi and Sacred Heart Academy in Biloxi, Mississippi. After World War II, O'Keefe graduated from Loyola University, in New Orleans, Louisiana.

== Military career ==
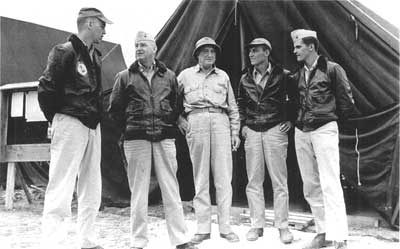
April 1945, the three USMC pilots of the VMF-323 "Death Rattlers" squadron who each scored "ace in a day" on April 22 in the Battle of Okinawa, meeting with two of the USMC's overall commanders (left to right): Maj Axtell (ace), 1st Marine Division CMC Vandegrift, TAF CMC Mulcahy, Maj Dorroh (ace), and Lt O'Keefe (ace)

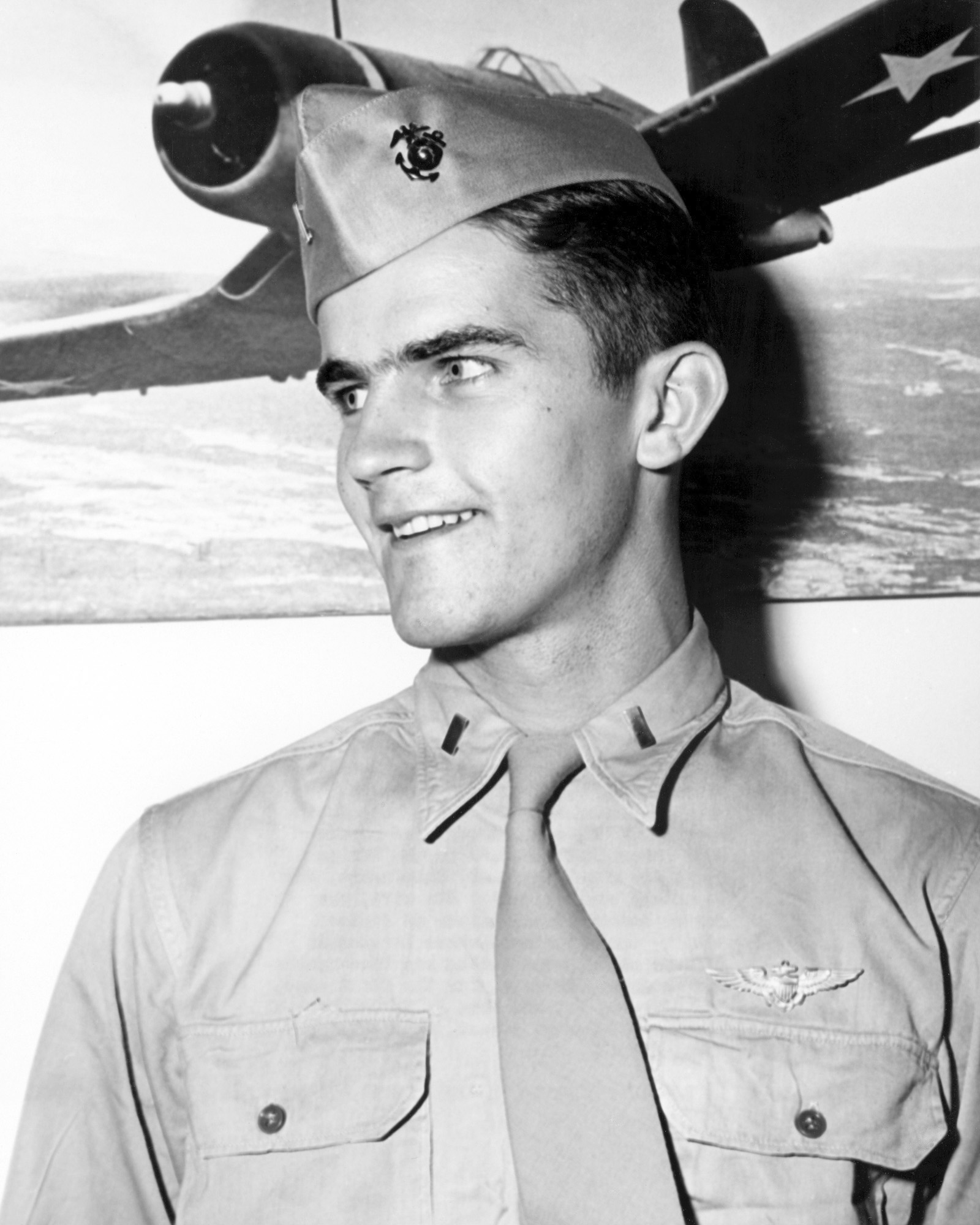
O'Keefe in Marine uniform in 1945

O'Keefe was attending Soule Business College during the attack on Pearl Harbor. He quickly enlisted in the U.S. Navy and served from 1942 to 1943. Then he became a fighter pilot with the U.S. Marine Corps from 1943 to 1945. He was a 1st Lt. with the VMF-323 Marine Squadron, known as the "Death Rattlers". He gained recognition for his contributions to a dogfight in Okinawa on April 22, 1945, in which he shot down five Japanese Kamikazes, becoming an ace in a single day. (This action was depicted in the Dogfights TV episode "Supersonic".)

On April 28, Lt. O'Keefe shot down another two enemy planes, bringing his total victories to seven, making him the highest scoring ace in Okinawa at the time.

== Awards ==
O'Keefe received the Navy Cross, the Distinguished Flying Cross, the Air Medal for his service and the Gold Star in lieu of a second 'Air Medal'.

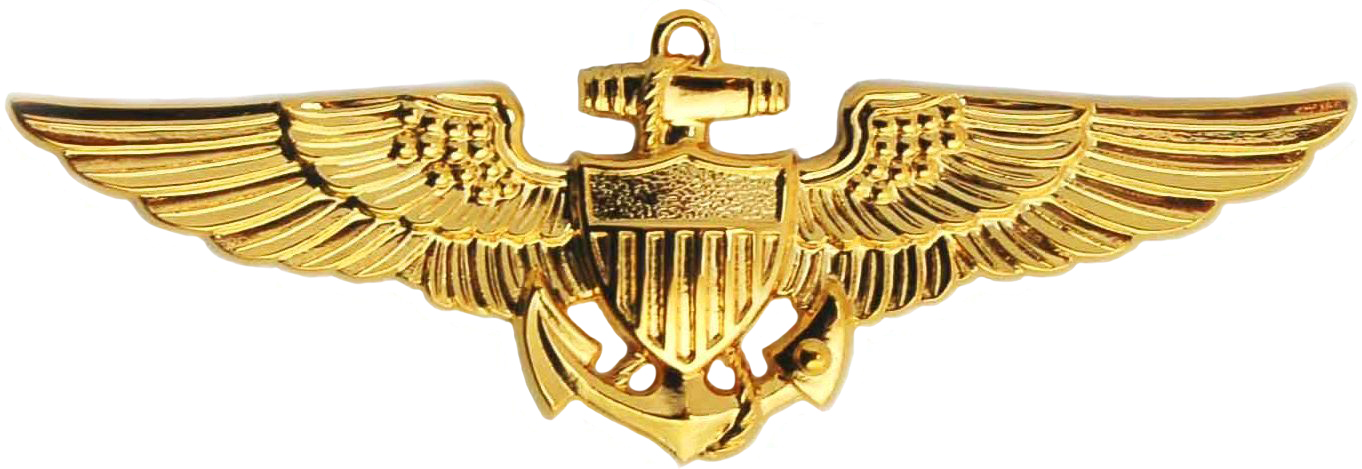

Naval Aviator Badge
Navy Cross		Distinguished Flying Cross
Air Medal w/ one 5/16" Gold Star	Navy Presidential Unit Citation	Navy Unit Commendation
American Campaign Medal	Asiatic-Pacific Campaign Medal w/ three 3/16" bronze stars	World War II Victory Medal

=== Navy Cross citation ===
Citation:

The President of the United States of America takes pleasure in presenting the Navy Cross to First Lieutenant Jeremiah Joseph O'Keefe (MCSN: 0-25432), United States Marine Corps Reserve, for extraordinary heroism and distinguished service in the line of his profession as Section Leader and a Pilot in Marine Fighting Squadron THREE HUNDRED TWENTY-THREE (VMF-323), Marine Air Group THIRTY-THREE (MAG-33), FOURTH Marine Aircraft Wing, in aerial combat against enemy Japanese forces during the assault on Okinawa Shima, Ryukyu Islands, on 22 April 1945. Fighting his plane aggressively in two engagements against a total of more than fifty Japanese suicide dive bombers, First Lieutenant O'Keefe pressed home a series of bold attacks in the face of hostile fire to destroy five of the enemy aircraft. By his resolute courage, skillful airmanship and devotion to duty, he aided materially in preventing the numerically superior force from reaching its objective, and his gallant conduct throughout reflects the highest credit upon First Lieutenant O'Keefe and the United States Naval Service.

In connection with celebration of his 90th birthday on July 12, 2013, a bronze bust depicting him in his gear as a young aviator was installed in the Gulfport-Biloxi International Airport, honoring him as an ace and member of the Death Rattlers. The only other person so honored with a bust in the airport is Lawrence E. Roberts, a Tuskegee Airman, Colonel in the US Air Force, recipient of the Congressional Gold Medal, and father of ABC host Robin Roberts.

On June 5, 2015, at the age of 91, O'Keefe was awarded the Congressional Gold Medal, the highest civilian award given by Congress. Presentation of the medal coincided with the celebration of the 150th anniversary of the O'Keefe family's funeral business on the Mississippi Gulf Coast.

== Personal life ==
O'Keefe and his wife, Annette Saxon O'Keefe, had 13 children, 43 grandchildren, and 33 great-grandchildren. Their family has a fondness for Southern cooking and storytelling which inspired Annette's 1994 publication of a family cookbook, Cooking on the Coast. Mrs. Annette O'Keefe died on May 16, 1998, after which O'Keefe married Martha Peterson O'Keefe. O'Keefe died on August 23, 2016, from heart failure and was buried at the Evergreen Cemetery in Ocean Springs, Mississippi.

O'Keefe was interested in civil rights and took a stand on racial justice throughout his life. O'Keefe described an event early in his life that led him to being active and attentive to minority relations. While in college, he was asked to join a business fraternity. The fraternity told him that Jews and Blacks were not allowed to participate in the fraternity; O'Keefe told the fraternity that he was uninterested in joining unless they allowed minorities to participate and join. The fraternity obliged, and altered their policy allowing minorities to join. O'Keefe then became president of the fraternity for a year succeeding the policy change.

== Business ==
The O'Keefe family has owned O'Keefe Funeral Homes since the 1860s. In 1953 O'Keefe bought the business from his father and in 1957 O'Keefe bought his major competitor's business, creating Bradford-O'Keefe Funeral Homes. He also founded a life insurance company, Gulf National Life in 1958.

In 1995 O'Keefe, represented by Willie E. Gary, won a jury trial concerning a contractual dispute involving his family businesses against Ray Loewen's Loewen Group of Canada. He and fellow plaintiffs were awarded $500 million in damages, a sum that would have bankrupted the defendant. O'Keefe eventually settled for a significantly lower sum of $175 million. The Burial, a film loosely inspired by the case, was released by Amazon Studios in October 2023.

== Political career ==
In 1954, O'Keefe was selected Outstanding Young Man of the year and later the Outstanding Citizen. He was elected to the Mississippi State Legislature in 1960 and served one term, ending 1964. He served as the Chairman of the 'Temperance Committee', fighting for liquor legalization, on a local-option basis, in Mississippi, the last remaining 'dry' state in the nation. In his freshman year he was named one of four most outstanding legislators for his service. One of his sons Jeremiah Joseph O'Keefe IV also served in the Mississippi Legislature from 1971 to 1979.

After completing his term in office, Jerry O'Keefe returned to his business and civic activities. He later was elected the Mayor of Biloxi, Mississippi for two terms from 1973 to 1981. During his tenure as mayor, O'Keefe stood up to the Ku Klux Klan refusing them a permit to hold a discriminatory parade in Biloxi, Mississippi. This act led to death threats and a burning cross in his yard. Nevertheless, O'Keefe stood his ground then as he had in 1945 and never backed down.

== Philanthropy ==
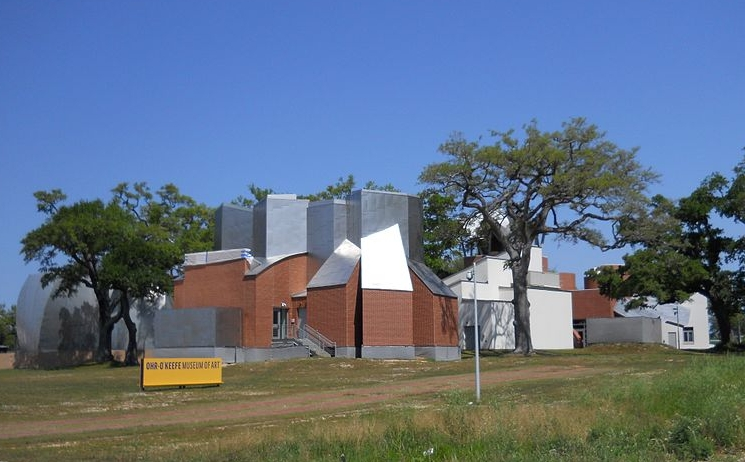
Grounds of Ohr–O'Keefe Museums of Art, Biloxi

Jerry O’Keefe and his wife Annette were longstanding participants in Gulf Coast civic and philanthropic activities. In 1967 and 1975, Jerry was honored by the United Fund Campaign for Distinguished Service to the People of Harrison County. He also received a Lifetime Achievement Award from the Boy Scouts of America's Pine Burr Area Council. He served as chair of many fundraising efforts by the local Catholic Church and co-chair of the campaign to build the Walter Anderson Museum of Art in Ocean Springs, MS.

With proceeds from settlement of the Loewen litigation, he and Annette founded and endowed the O’Keefe Foundation to support local organizations and various charitable purposes.

After Annette's death in 1998, he and the family made a major contribution in her memory to a Biloxi art museum dedicated to the work of local art potter George Ohr. In gratitude for that gift and Jerry's prodigious fundraising to build a new Frank Gehry-designed museum complex, the museum renamed the museum the Ohr–O'Keefe Museum of Art in Annette's honor and agreed to include an exhibition space dedicated to African American art and culture.

== See also ==
- George C. Axtell
- Jefferson J. DeBlanc
- Archie G. Donahue
- John L. Smith
- James E. Swett
- Herbert J. Valentine
