= Jeremiah Joseph O'Keefe IV =

American politician and businessman

Member of the Mississippi House of Representatives
- In office 1971–1979
- Preceded by: Clyde Woodfield

Personal details
- Born: May 21, 1946
- Died: December 3, 2007 (aged 61)
- Parent: Jeremiah Joseph O'Keefe (father)

Jeremiah Joseph O'Keefe IV (May 21, 1946 – December 3, 2007) was an American politician and businessman.

Born in Biloxi, Mississippi, O'Keefe went to Notre Dame High School in Biloxi, Mississippi. He, then, served in the United States Marine Corps from 1964 to 1967. He graduated from University of Southern Mississippi in 1970 and then went to Tulane University Law School. He was involved with the gas and oil drilling rights business in Louisiana and also was the captain of his shrimp boat. He owned a restaurant in Florida and helped write the O'Keefe family cookbook: "Cooking on the Gulf." From 1971 to 1979, O'Keefe served in the Mississippi House of Representatives. His father Jeremiah Joseph O'Keefe also served in the Mississippi Legislature. He died, at his home, in Ocean Springs, Mississippi.
