= Laurence O'Keefe =

Laurence O'Keefe may refer to:

- Laurence O'Keefe (rock musician) (born 1965), English musician, formerly bass player with Dark Star, Levitation and The Jazz Butcher
- Laurence O'Keefe (composer) (born 1969), US composer, wrote music and/or lyrics for musicals such as Bat Boy: The Musical, and Legally Blonde: The Musical
- Laurence O'Keeffe (1931–2003), British diplomat, ambassador to Czechoslovakia
