= Daniel J. O'Keefe =

American scholar

Daniel J. O'Keefe (born 1950) is an American communication and argumentation theory scholar. He is the Owen L. Coon Professor Emeritus in the Department of Communication Studies at Northwestern University. His research concerns persuasion and argumentation, with a focus on meta-analytic synthesis of research concerning persuasive message effects. This program of work often addresses the question of whether normatively good argumentation contributes to persuasive success.

O'Keefe is the author of Persuasion: Theory and Research (ISBN 1452276676), a review of empirical research on persuasion. His work has been published in the Journal of Communication, Human Communication Research, Communication Monographs, Communication Theory, Communication Yearbook, Argumentation, Quarterly Journal of Speech, Argumentation and Advocacy, and other journals.

== Awards ==
From the National Communication Association:

- Charles Woolbert Research Award, 1986
- Golden Anniversary Monograph Award, 1982
- Rhetorical and Communication Theory Division Distinguished Scholar Award, 2005

From the American Forensic Association:

- Daniel Rohrer Memorial Research Award, 1977

From the International Communication Association:

- Fellow (elected 2018)
- Steven H. Chaffee Career Achievement Award, 2024
- Health Communication Division Article of the Year Award, 2008
- Best Article Award, 2004
- Division 1 John E. Hunter Meta-Analysis Award, 2000, 2022

From the International Society for the Study of Argumentation:

- Distinguished Scholar Award, 2002

From the University of Illinois at Urbana-Champaign:

- Humanities Council Teaching Excellence Award, 1999

From Northwestern University:

- Galbut Outstanding Faculty Award, School of Communication, 2010
- Charles Deering McCormick Professor of Teaching Excellence, 2016
