= Service Corporation International =

American deathcare provider

- Type: Public
- Traded as: NYSE: SCI; S&P 400 component
- Industry: Death care
- Founded: 1962
- Headquarters: Houston, Texas, U.S.
- Number of locations: more than 1,900 (2022)
- Key people: Robert L. Waltrip, Founder; Thomas L. Ryan, CEO
- Products: Funerals, cremations, pre-planning
- Brands: Dignity Memorial, National Cremation, Advantage, Funeraria Del Angel, Neptune Society
- Revenue: ▲US$4,143 million (2021)
- Net income: ▲US$803 million (2021)
- Total assets: ▲US$15,691 million (2021)
- Number of employees: 20,840 (2022)
- Website: Official website

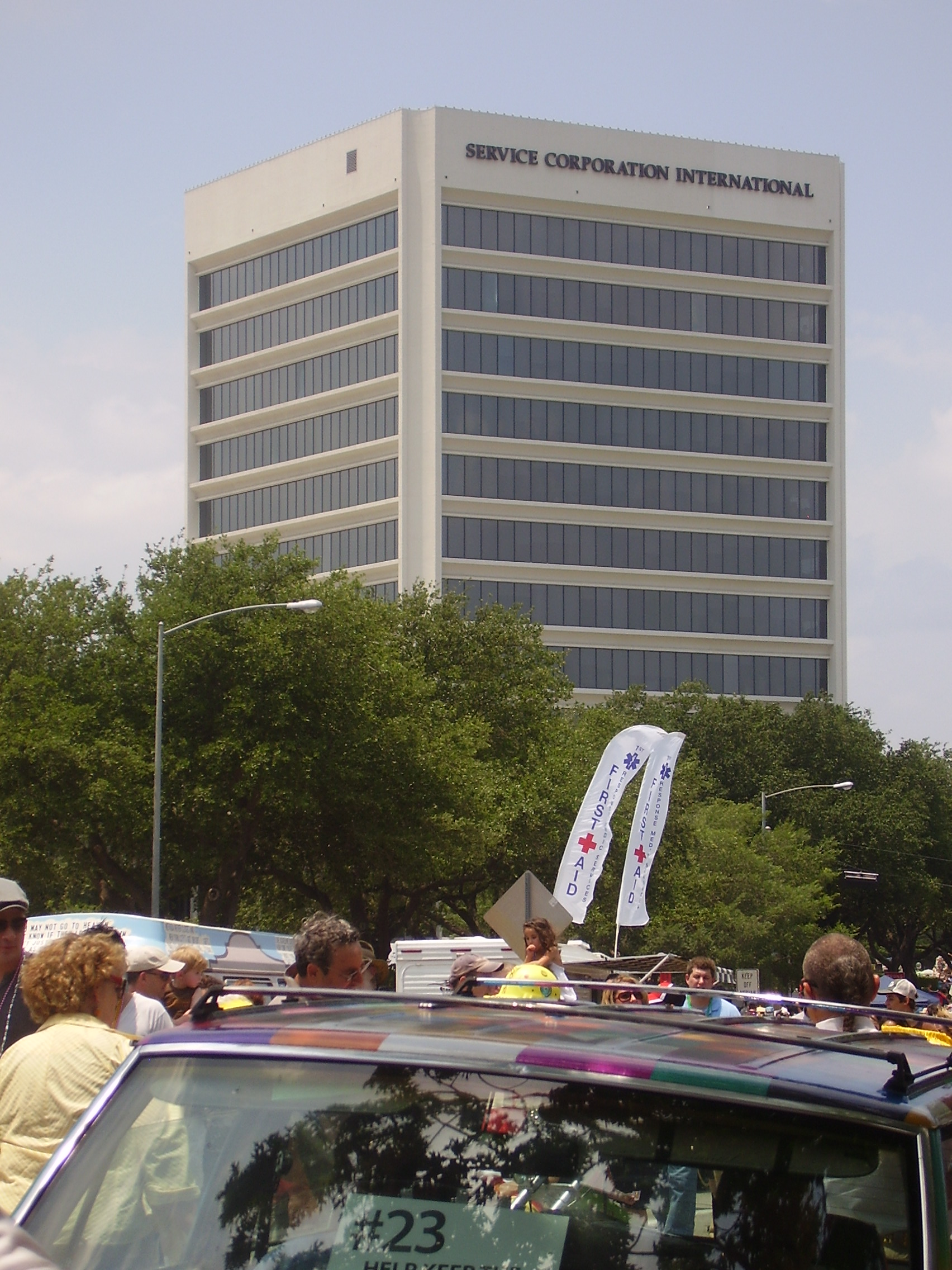
Headquarters

Service Corporation International is an American provider of funeral goods and services as well as cemetery property and cremation services. It is headquartered in Neartown, Houston, Texas, and operates secondary corporate offices in Jefferson, Louisiana (near New Orleans). (Note: "Our Boundaries". Neartown Association.) (Note: "Contact Us". SCI.) SCI operates more than 1500 funeral homes and 400 cemeteries.

== Company history ==
Robert L. Waltrip founded the company in 1962. (Note: Ille, Nicholas V. (2020-05-10). "Who is Service Corporation International?". US Funerals Online.) SCI began as a small network of funeral homes and cemeteries in the Houston area.

SCI, Alderwoods Group, and Stewart Enterprises emerged from the 1990s as the three largest companies in the industry. On December 31, 1999, SCI owned and operated 3,823 funeral service locations, 525 cemeteries, 198 crematoria and two insurance operations located in 20 countries on five continents. (Note: "Form 10-K: Service Corporation International (1999)". U.S. Securities and Exchange Commission. 2000-03-30.)

In 1999, SCI also introduced its Dignity Memorial branding. (Note: "Dignity Memorial Extends Network by Nearly 600 Locations". Houston Chronicle. PR Newswire. 2007-07-17.)

Between 2002 and 2006, SCI reduced its net debt (total debt minus cash) by more than US$1.0 billion, increased operating cash flow, and simplified its field management organization to enhance efficiency, performance, and accountability. It also changed business and sales processes, tightened internal controls following the protocols, strengthened corporate governance standards, and established a new training and development system. For its shareholders, SCI returned value through more than US$335 million in share repurchases and it resumed payment of a regular quarterly dividend in early 2005, the first since 1999.

== Acquisitions ==
In 2006, SCI merged with Alderwoods Group, its nearest competitor in terms of size. The Federal Trade Commission (FTC) blocked the merger, citing concerns over consumer choice. After SCI agreed to divest funeral home and cemetery locations in several markets and end licensing agreements with other funeral homes, the FTC allowed the merger to continue. By 2007, the integration of Alderwoods's locations and operations was complete.

In 2009, SCI put in a bid to purchase Keystone North America for US$208 million (US$312 million as of 2025). The purchase was completed in 2010 and added about 200 locations.

In May 2013, SCI signed a US$1.4 billion deal to purchase Stewart Enterprises, the second-largest death care company. (Note: "FTC Puts Conditions on Service Corporation International's Proposed $1.4 Billion Acquisition of Rival Funeral and Cemetery Services Provider". Federal Trade Commission (Press release). 2013-12-23.) In December 2013, the FTC imposed conditions on the acquisition, requiring the two companies to sell 53 funeral homes and 38 cemeteries in 59 local markets, and requiring the merged company to be subject to a ten-year period during which the FTC will review any attempt by the company to acquire funeral or cemetery assets in those local markets.

== Brands ==
SCI operates the following brands in the United States and Canada: (Note: "Our Brands". SCI.)

- Advantage
- Caballero Rivero
- Dignité
- Dignity Memorial
- Dignity Memorial Premier Collection
- Funeraria del Angel
- LHT Consulting Group, LLC
- Neptune Memorial Reef
- Neptune Society/Trident Society/Neptune Society of Northern California
- National Cremation
- Rose Hills Memorial Park

== Notable properties ==
- Caballero Rivero Woodlawn Park North Cemetery and Mausoleum in Miami
- Crown Hill Funeral Home and Cemetery in Indianapolis
- Frank E. Campbell Funeral Chapel in Manhattan, New York City
- Eden Memorial Park Cemetery, Los Angeles
- Glenwood Memorial Gardens, Broomall, Pennsylvania
- Greenwood/Memory Lawn Mortuary & Cemetery in Phoenix, Arizona
- Joseph Gawler's Sons in Washington, D.C.
- Joshua Memorial Park in Lancaster, California
- Lake Lawn Metairie Funeral Home and Cemeteries in New Orleans
- Oehler and Lauterburg & Oehler Funeral Homes in suburban Chicago
- Pierce Brothers Westwood Village Memorial Park and Mortuary in Los Angeles
- Riverside Memorial Chapel in Manhattan, New York City
- San Francisco Columbarium & Funeral Home, in San Francisco, California
- Sparkman-Hillcrest Memorial Park Cemetery in Dallas
- Valhalla Memorial Park Cemetery in North Hollywood, Los Angeles, California
- Woodlawn Memorial Park Cemetery in Colma, California
- Woodlawn Memorial Park & Woodlawn-Roesch-Patton Funeral Home in Nashville, Tennessee
- Centre Funéraire Côte-des-Neiges in Montréal, Québec

== Controversies ==
=== Costs ===
Writing in an October 24, 2013, issue of Bloomberg Businessweek, journalist Paul M. Barrett found, despite its lower overhead, SCI has higher prices than independent funeral home operators. Barrett quoted "data compiled" by a "'concierge' funeral planning service" Everest Funeral Package, which found that for "traditional funerals, SCI charges US$6,256 on average (excluding casket and cemetery plot), 42 percent more than independents." In reply, SCI points to "overwhelmingly positive responses" on customer surveys and states they provide "top value" at a variety of funeral price points.

=== Texas ===
In the late 1990s, SCI was involved in a controversy involving alleged violations of Texas State embalming laws. The proceedings took a political slant due to Robert Waltrip's friendship with the family of then-governor George W. Bush and Waltrip's campaign contributions to various members of the Bush family.

Referred to as "Funeralgate" or "Formaldegate" in the media, the controversy was widely publicized when Eliza May, a director with the Texas Funeral Service Commission (TFSC), was fired while investigating SCI. May alleged in a civil suit that she was fired because she refused to halt her investigation despite pressure to do so from Governor Bush.

May's lawyers subpoenaed President Bush to testify at the trial, but Texas judge John K. Dietz threw out the subpoena on the grounds that the then-governor was not in a position to have enough specialized information to require his involvement. (Note: Duggan, Paul (1999-08-30). "Bush Need Not Testify, Judge Rules". The Washington Post. Austin, Texas. p. A2.)

The lawsuit was settled in 2001 for more than US$200,000 (equivalent to US$363,653 in 2025). SCI and the state of Texas were required to jointly pay the decision. (Note: Bryce, Robert (2004-05-14). "Final Disposition: The Texas Funeral Service Commission is up to its ashes in trouble again". Austin Chronicle.) On January 23, 2004, the TFSC fined SCI an additional US$21,000 for administrative penalties.

=== Florida ===
On January 18, 2023, it was reported on local news that the Escambia County Sheriffs Office was called to investigate a crime of corpse abuse by an employee who was caught in the act, by another employee. The alleged criminal was never charged with the crime because he committed suicide the same day. The investigation into the crime and the Oaklawn Funeral Home is still pending.

In 2001, it was reported that employees of the Memorial Gardens cemetery near Fort Lauderdale, Florida, had oversold the cemetery, so bodies were buried in the wrong places, separating husbands from wives; vaults were cracked open by a backhoe, bodies were exhumed, with bones, skulls and shrouds thrown into nearby woods, bodies were stacked on top of each other, and remains were relocated without notifying relatives.

The allegations were particularly appalling to the Jewish cemetery's more religiously observant customers, The Miami Herald reported. Traditional Jewish law requires bodies to be buried intact and prohibits disturbing the dead. (Note: "Gruesome Photos, Video Show Bodies Discarded in Woods Behind Cemetery". Fox News. Associated Press. 2015-01-13.) SCI reached a US$14 million agreement with the Florida attorney general's office in 2003 that required it to repair plots and reorganize the cemeteries to ensure all graves were properly marked and the grounds could accommodate all plots sold. SCI also settled a separate class-action lawsuit on behalf of 350 families for US$100 million.

=== Virginia ===
On April 26, 2007, The Washington Post reported that an SCI cemetery in Alexandria, Virginia, had improperly buried the remains of the stillborn daughter of Nsombi Hale in a grave too shallow (in a grave about 8 inches (20 cm) deep). Nsombi Hale was filing suit against SCI. (Note: White, Josh (2009-04-26). "Too Shallow a Hole to Bury a Baby". The Washington Post.)

After an internal investigation by SCI, attorneys working for SCI denied the charges against the company in a letter to Virginia funeral regulators, (Note: White, Josh (2009-07-02). "Falls Church Funeral Home Denies Mishandling Bodies". The Washington Post.) and a few days later, the Post reported that Robert Ranghelli, one of the SCI employees who had corroborated the initial reports of improper handling of corpses, was fired for "speaking with the media" after having been on administrative leave for several months following the initial reports in the newspaper. (Note: White, Josh (2009-07-07). "Funeral Worker Who Alleged Violations Is Fired". The Washington Post.)

On April 5, 2009, The Washington Post reported that the National Funeral Home, a facility owned by SCI in the Falls Church area of Fairfax County, Virginia, which also acts as a centralized embalming and dressing station for embalming and body preparation for other nearby SCI-owned operations (Arlington Funeral Home, Danzansky-Goldberg Memorial Chapel, and Demaine Funeral Home), was storing naked bodies in various stages of decomposition in conditions described as "disgusting, degrading and humiliating". The story went on to report that as many as 200 bodies were stored on "makeshift gurneys in the garage" and "at least half a dozen veterans destined for the hallowed ground at Arlington National Cemetery were left in their coffins on a garage rack". The Post reported that documentation describing these conditions had been reported to the Virginia Board of Funeral Directors and Embalmers. (Note: White, Josh (2009-04-05). "Funeral Home Employees Say Bodies Were Mishandled". The Washington Post.)

A few days later, the Post reported that family members of a deceased Army veteran whose remains were stored in an unrefrigerated garage at National Funeral Home asked the Fairfax County Commonwealth's Attorney to investigate the actions of National and its parent company, SCI, as crimes.

The Post further reported that the family of retired U.S. Army Colonel Andrew DeGraff filed a lawsuit in Fairfax County alleging that SCI mishandled DeGraff's remains. According to the article, an SCI spokesman said that the company is conducting an internal investigation. (Note: White, Josh (2009-04-15). "Family Sues Funeral Home That Left Body in Garage". The Washington Post.)

=== California ===
On September 14, 2009, a class-action lawsuit was filed against SCI and Eden Memorial Park, a Jewish cemetery managed by SCI in Mission Hills charging that they were destroying graves to make room for new interments. (Note: Boudreau, Abbie; Zamost, Scott (2009-09-11). "California cemetery accused of desecrating remains". CNN.)

The Los Angeles Times reported that state officials found no evidence of mass grave disturbances. Russ Heimerich, a spokesman for the California Department of Consumer Affairs, said, "We have not seen any evidence of the kind of massive desecration that is being alleged. The kind of activity they're alleging is not easily hidden, especially on a willful, large-scale basis." The plaintiff's attorney rejected the findings of the state's investigation.

Michael Avenatti, the plaintiff's attorney, said more than 800 families have joined the class action suit. Avenatti claims the state's investigation was shoddy, saying, "Investigators from the state were told by various groundskeepers over a year ago that they had been repeatedly told to throw bones away, and yet for some reason, the state didn't adequately follow up."

SCI denied all charges. After the lawsuit was filed, the Consumer Affairs Department reviewed five to six years of the cemetery's annual inspection records and found no indication that graves had been disturbed. According to the Los Angeles Times article, "The agency also asked the dozens of families that contacted officials to look for signs of disturbances — shifted or cracked gravestones or anything else that appeared different from previous visits — and didn't receive a single call back, he said." (Note: Kim, Victoria (2009-11-13). "State officials find no evidence of mass grave desecration in Valley". Los Angeles Times.)

In January 2012, the lawsuit against Eden Memorial Park was ruled to be a valid class action in Los Angeles Superior Court, with the trial scheduled to begin in May 2012. In February 2014, the parties reached a settlement in the amount of US$80.5 million. (Note: Moshtaghian, Artemis (2014-02-27). "California cemetery agrees to $80 million settlement over desecrating remains". CNN. Archived from the original on 2014-03-05. Alt URL)

In 2015, families filed a second suit alleging that the practice continued after the first settlement. (Note: Abram, Susan (2015-03-07). "Jewish cemetery Eden Memorial Park sued again for throwing out remains". Los Angeles Daily News.) The suit remains pending as of 2020.

In 2024, the attorney general of California announced a settlement with SCI, which does business in the state under their Neptune Society and Trident Society brands, for state enforcement actions that alleged that SCI had violated the California Unfair Competition Law and False Advertising Law by engaging in false and deceptive advertising in the marketing and sale of pre-need cremation packages. The proposed settlement which is pending court approval, would provide full restitution to customers, comprehensive injunctive relief, and $23 million in civil penalties.

=== Massachusetts ===
In 2010, the State Board of Registration charged the SCI-owned Stanetsky Chapel, a Jewish funeral home in Brookline with serious violations of state law and regulations in connection with an incident where a woman was buried in the wrong grave, then disinterred without a legal permit and reburied in the correct grave with the woman's family not being notified of the mistake and the corrective procedure. As a result, in December 2011, the State Board announced a Consent Agreement and levied the biggest fine in its history, US$18,000, against Stanetsky and SCI, and suspended the license of the Stanetsky general manager for a year. Other staff members involved in the incident were subject to punitive actions ranging from additional professional training to license revocation. The incident received widespread local media coverage. The Board's action was also published on its website. (Note: Applebaum, Teddy (2011-12-21). "Brookline funeral home fined for burial mix up". Wicked Local.)

In a case first reported on April 7, 2005, The Boston Globe reported J.S. Waterman's & Sons, also owned by SCI, was found by the Board to have accidentally cremated the body of a stillborn infant in 2003. The infant's body was apparently placed on a gurney that held an adult woman's body that was scheduled for cremation. As a result of a civil suit brought by the infant's family, Waterman's was ordered to pay the parents US$325,000 (equivalent to US$485,993 in 2025), with a pending legal claim that the mortuary violated the state's consumer protection law that could triple the damages, The Boston Globe reported. The family's lawyer, Gordon T. Walker, said SCI could be hit with additional costs, as there is a pending claim that the company violated the state's consumer protection law. The civil verdict was made in Suffolk Superior Court on March 4, 2008. The jury awarded US$75,000 because of emotional distress and US$250,000 because it found the funeral home was negligent and intentionally inflicted emotional harm.
